= Paço de São Cristóvão =

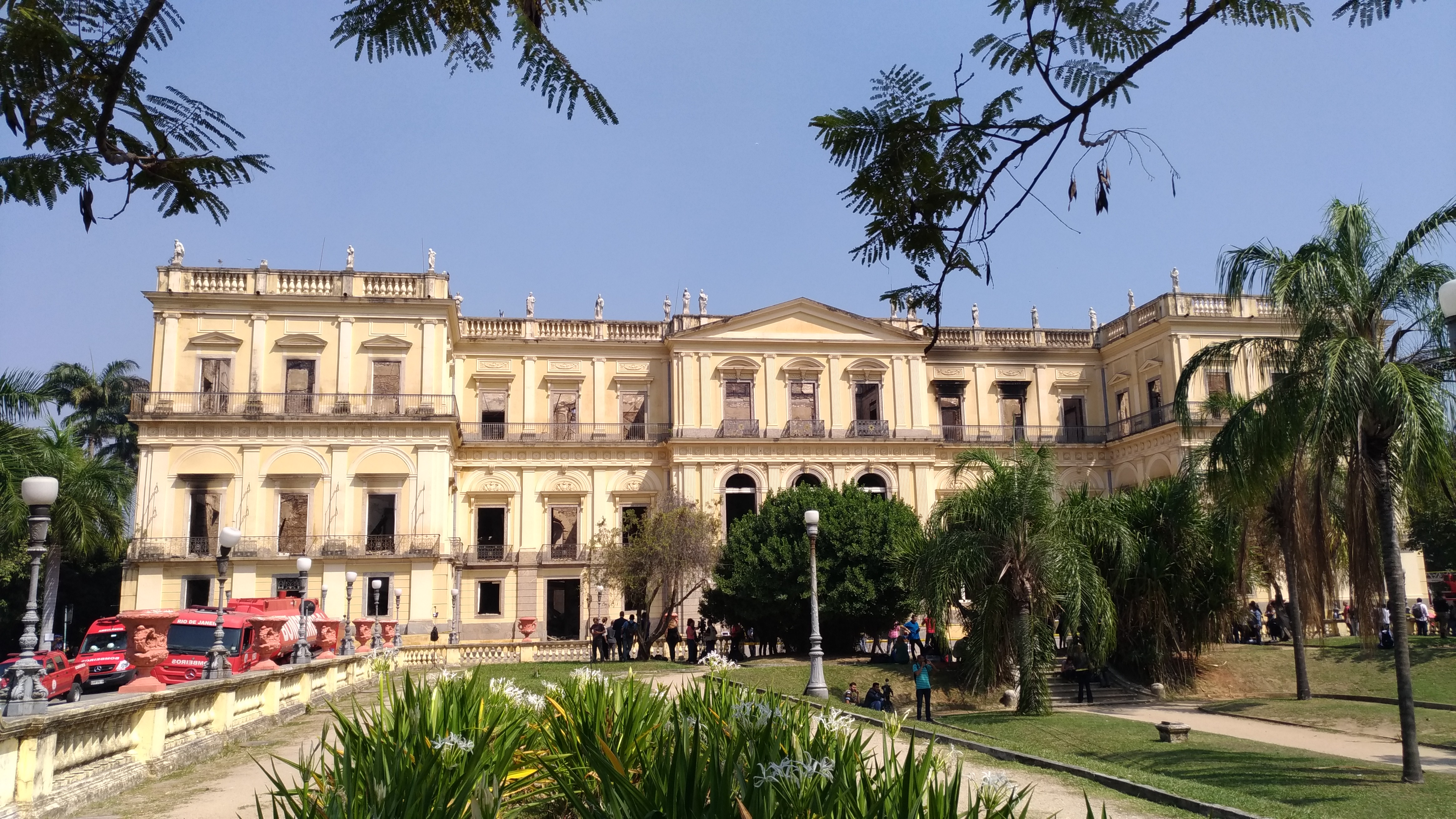
- The building on 3 September 2018, the day after the fire

- Location within Rio de Janeiro
- Alternative names: Museu Nacional

General information
- Status: Under restoration
- Type: Palace
- Architectural style: Neoclassical
- Location: Av. Pedro II, s/n São Cristóvão; Rio de Janeiro - RJ; 20940-040, Brazil, Quinta da Boa Vista, Rio de Janeiro, Brazil
- Coordinates: 22°54′20″S 43°13′33″W
- Elevation: 26 m (85 ft)
- Current tenants: National Museum of Brazil
- Construction started: 1803
- Completed: 1862
- Inaugurated: 1893
- Closed: 3 September 2018
- Destroyed: 2 September 2018
- Owner: Federal University of Rio de Janeiro

Height
- Roof: 23 m

Technical details
- Material: Brick, Stucco
- Lifts/elevators: 0
- Grounds: 5,920 square metres (63,700 ft^{2})

Design and construction
- Architect: Pierre-Joseph Pézerat (Pedro José Pezerát)
- Services engineer: Concrejato
- Known for: Museum

National Historic Heritage of Brazil
- Designated: 99
- Reference no.: 1938

Paço de São Cristóvão (Portuguese pronunciation: [ˈpasu d(ʒi) sɐ̃w kɾisˈtɔvɐ̃w]; English: Palace of Saint Christopher; also known as Palácio Imperial or Palácio Imperial de São Cristóvão) was an imperial palace located in the Quinta da Boa Vista park in the Imperial Neighbourhood of São Cristóvão, Rio de Janeiro, Brazil. It served as residence to the Portuguese royal family and later to the Brazilian imperial family until 1889, when the country became a republic through a coup d'état deposing Emperor Pedro II. The palace briefly served as a public building by the provisional government for the constituent assembly of the first republican constitution. It housed the major part (92.5%) of the collections of the National Museum of Brazil, which, together with the building, were largely destroyed by a fire on 2 September 2018. The palace was reopened after restoration in 2025.

== History ==
=== Background ===
Historical affiliations

Portuguese Royal House 1818–1822
(Empire of Brazil) Brazilian Imperial House 1822–1889
(Brazil) Brazilian government 1889–1892
National Museum 1892–present

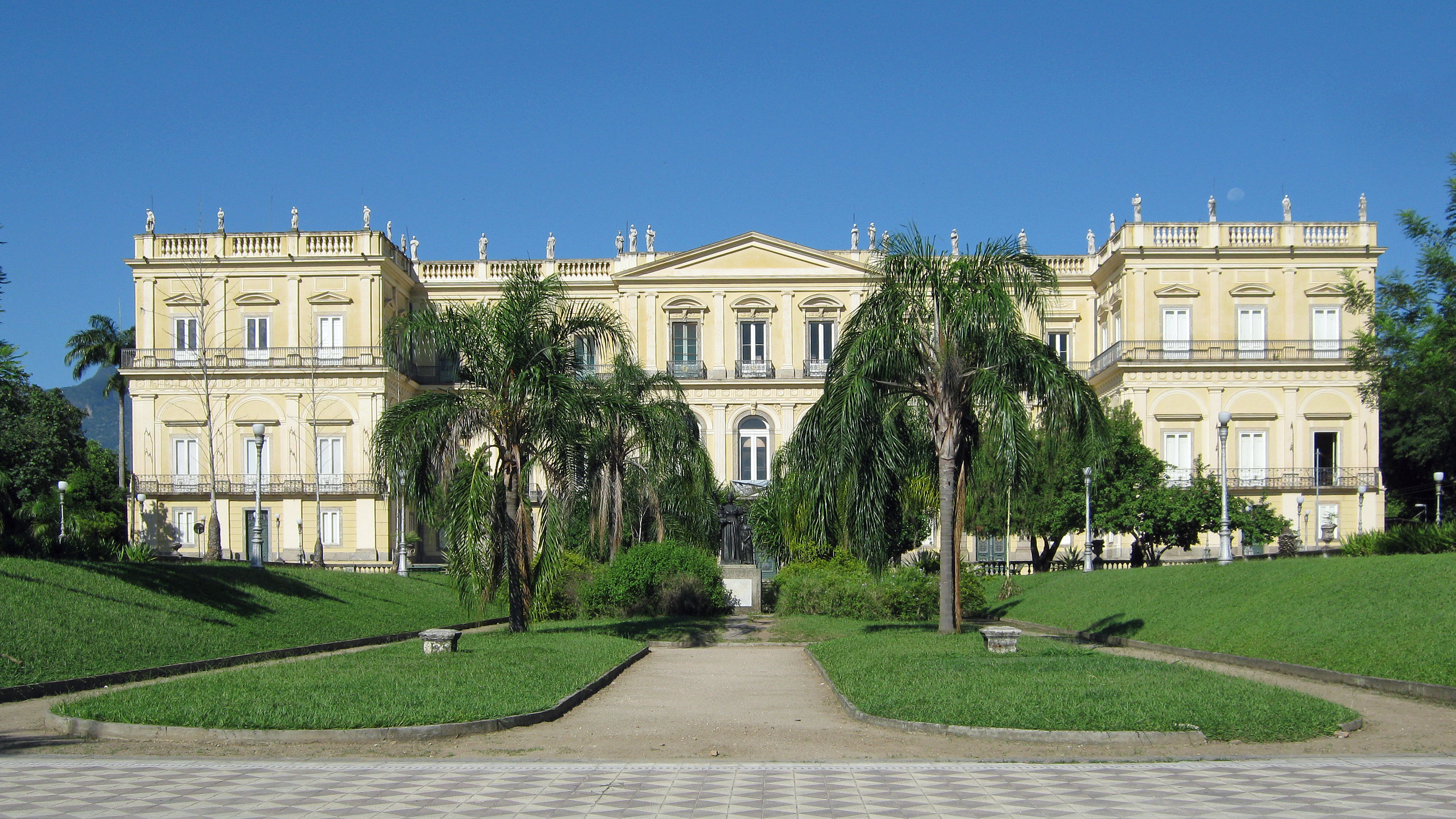
Serving as a museum

In the 16th and 17th centuries, the area where the palace is located was part of a Jesuit farm in the outskirts of Rio de Janeiro. With the expulsion of the Order in 1759, the property was dismembered and passed into private ownership. In the early 19th century, the area became known as the Quinta da Boa Vista (Estate with a Beautiful View), because the Tijuca Forest, Corcovado, and Cajú beach could be seen from it; it belonged to a Portuguese-Lebanese slave merchant, Elie Antun Lubbus, (Elias Antônio Lopes in Portuguese), who erected, around 1803, a hilltop manor house from which one could see Guanabara Bay. When the Portuguese court was transferred to Brazil, in 1808, Lopes donated his farm to the prince regent, João VI. João VI appreciated the gift and stayed for long periods in the manor house. Before belonging to the monarchy, the residence was just one of many colonial-style mansions scattered throughout the country. With the arrival of João VI to Brazil, who had left Lisbon fleeing Napoleon in 1808, countless houses in Rio were expropriated to house the royal entourage. Lopes preempted that fate for the Quinta da Boa Vista, and in return, João VI granted Lopes titles of nobility and a fat indemnity. The mansion underwent many renovations over the decades, including the addition of an imposing masonry and cast-iron gate, the erection of a Moorish style side tower, construction of a semicircular staircase to the second floor residence, and, later, a second tower in the neoclassical style. A third floor was added, and the Moorish tower rebuilt in neoclassical style. All of the changes left the Palace of São Cristóvão appropriate to the power of the Brazilian Empire at its height. In 1847, Parliament approved a government bill that would allocate 240 contos de reis to complete the seemingly endless reforms. For Senator Clemente Pereira (PA), Pedro II had to leave Sao Cristóvão, Pereira's proposal was approved, but the government did not even design a new imperial palace.

==== Royal residence ====
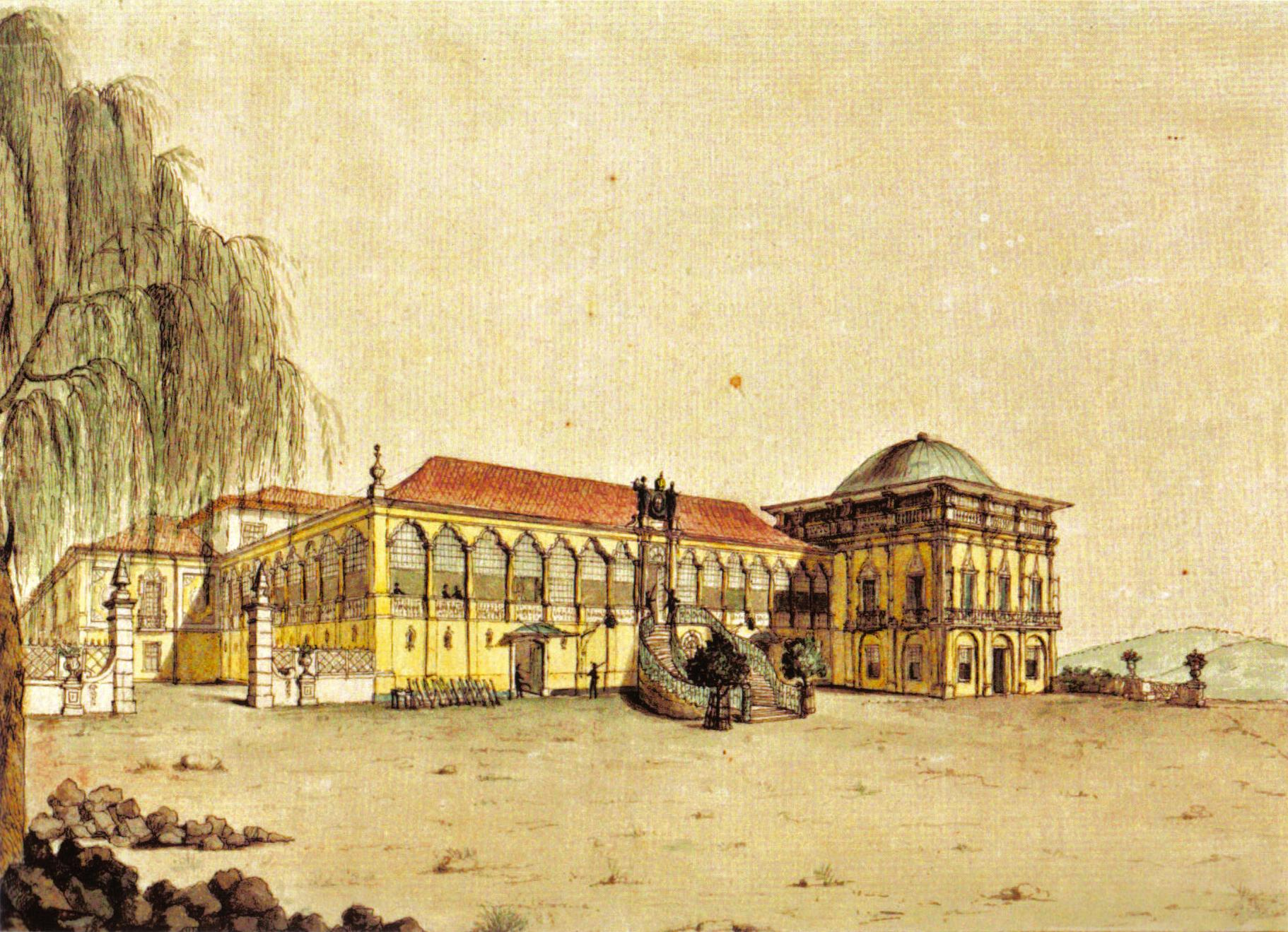
View of the palace in 1817 before the neoclassical intervention

Prince Regent John and his family had been living in the Paço Imperial since their arrival in Rio de Janeiro in 1808. The prince regent felt very honored by Elias's gift of the best house in Rio and rewarded Elias with another property, not quite as grand. He began transforming the manor into a royal residence. At the time, the area of the farm was still surrounded by mangroves and communication by land with the city was difficult. Later, the wetlands were drained and the roads improved.

To better accommodate the royal family, the manor house, though vast and comfortable, needed to be adapted. The most important renovation was begun at the time of the nuptials of Prince Pedro with the Archduchess Maria Leopoldina of Austria, in 1819, and finished 1821. The renovation was directed by English architect John Johnston. In front of the palace, Johnston installed a decorative portico, a gift sent from England to Brazil by Hugh Percy, 2nd Duke of Northumberland. The gate, inspired by Robert Adams' porch for the "Sion House", the nobleman's residence in England, is shaped in "Coade stone" manufactured by the English company Coade & Sealy.

The architectural line of the palace is similar to that of the Ajuda Palace which, left behind in Lisbon, was never finished. The Palace of São Cristóvão won deserved prominence as the new state palace of the United Kingdom of Portugal, Brazil and the Algarves and, subsequently, of the Portuguese Empire.

==== Imperial residence ====
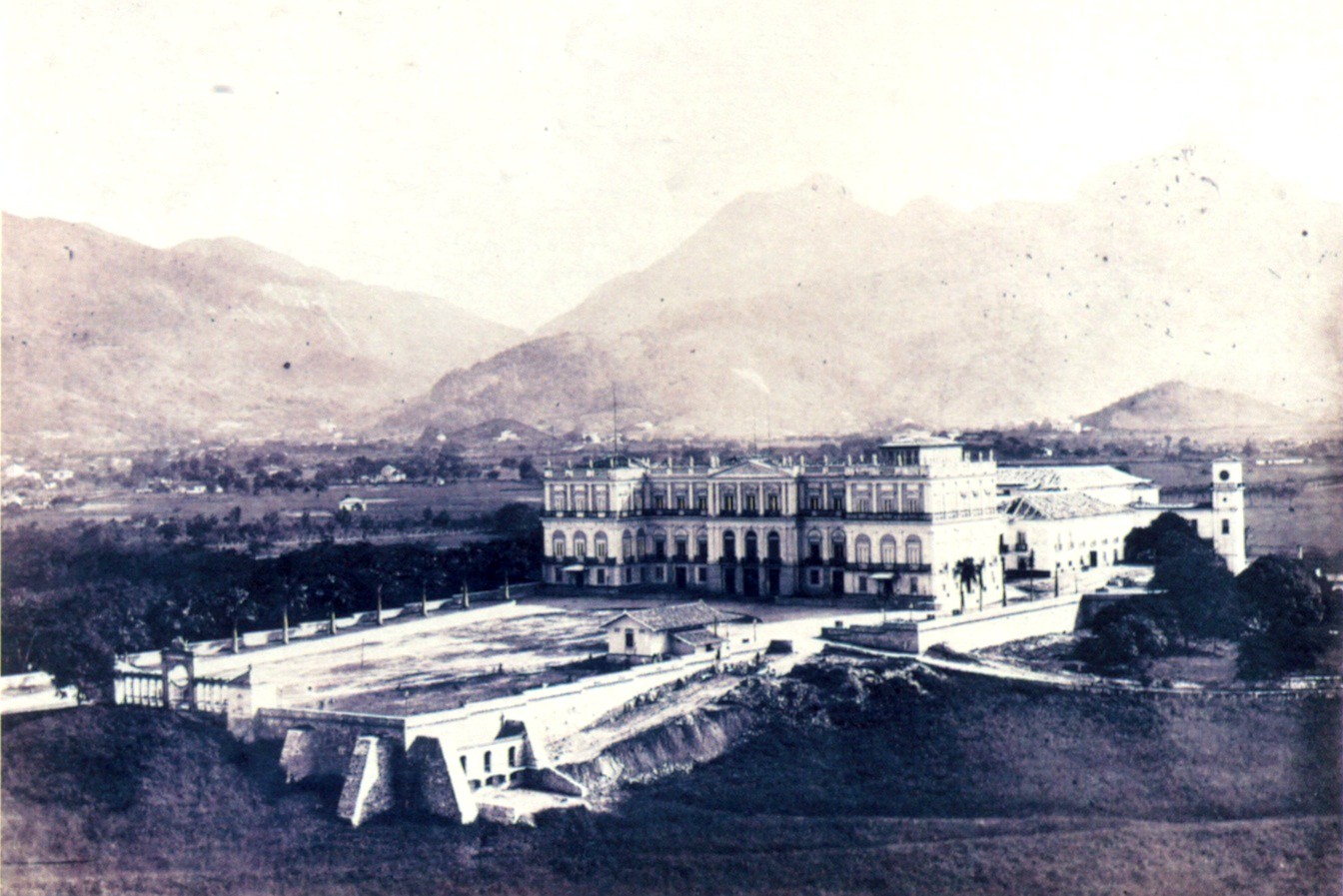
The Imperial Palace after the Neoclassical intervention, in 1862

After the declaration of independence of Brazil in 1822, the palace became the residence of Emperor Pedro I. The remodelling and expansion of the palace continued under Portuguese architect Manuel da Costa (1822–1826), followed by French architect Pierre-Joseph Pézerat, known in Portuguese as Pedro José Pezerát (1826–1831), credited as the author of the definitive Neoclassical project of the building. He added a new tower to the left of the main façade and added a third floor to the palace. The works were continued after 1847 by Brazilian artist Manuel de Araújo Porto-alegre, who harmonised the style of the façades, followed by the German Theodore Marx (1857–1868). Italian painter Mario Bragaldi decorated many of the rooms of the palace, including the Throne Room and the Ambassadors' Room, with paintings in trompe-l'œil.

After the marriage of Pedro I and Archduchess Maria Leopoldina of Austria in 1817, the imperial couple resided in the palace. The future Queen of Portugal, Maria II, and the future Emperor of Brazil Pedro II were born here. Empress Maria Leopoldina died in the palace in 1826. Pedro II, future Emperor, grew up and was educated in the palace, and in 1869 ordered the remodelling of the gardens. French garden designer Auguste François Marie Glaziou was put in charge of the project, which included artificial lakes, bridges, caves and fake ancient temples, all following the Romantic trend of the time. Pedro II's children were also born in the palace, including Princess Isabel, famous for having abolished slavery from Brazil in 1888. After the Proclamation of the Republic in 1889, the Imperial family left the country and the palace and its surrounding gardens became empty.

=== Republican period ===
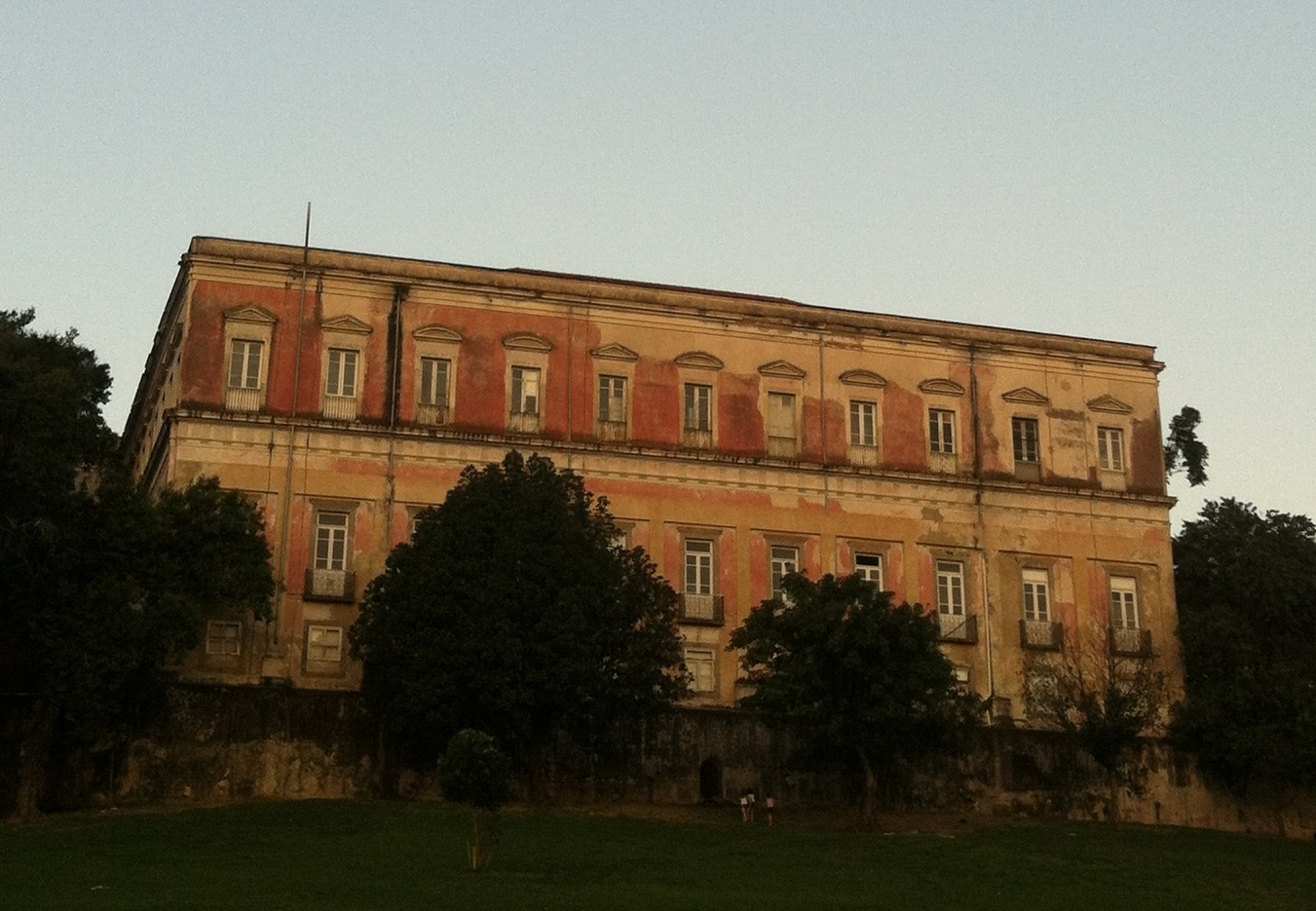
Rear of the palace in 2015 showing evidence of the neglect of recent years

In 1891, the building was used by Brazilian politicians writing the first Republican Constitution of the country.

In 1892, the director of the National Museum of Rio de Janeiro managed to transfer the institution from the Campo de Santana to the palace. The inner decoration of the palace was dispersed, but part of it can still be found in other museums, like the Imperial Museum of Petrópolis, in which the Throne Room was reassembled.

== National Museum ==
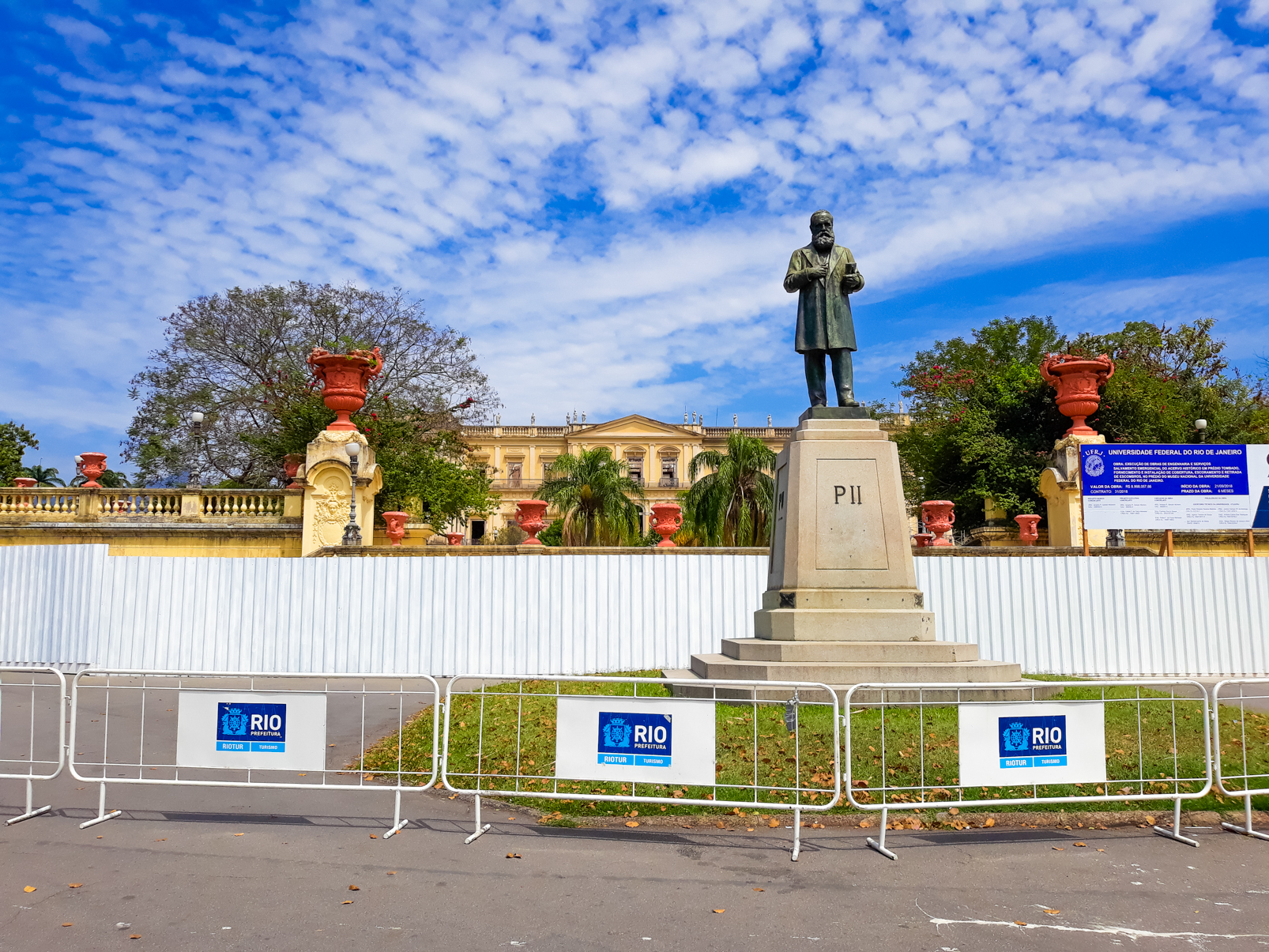
Palace after the 2018 fire

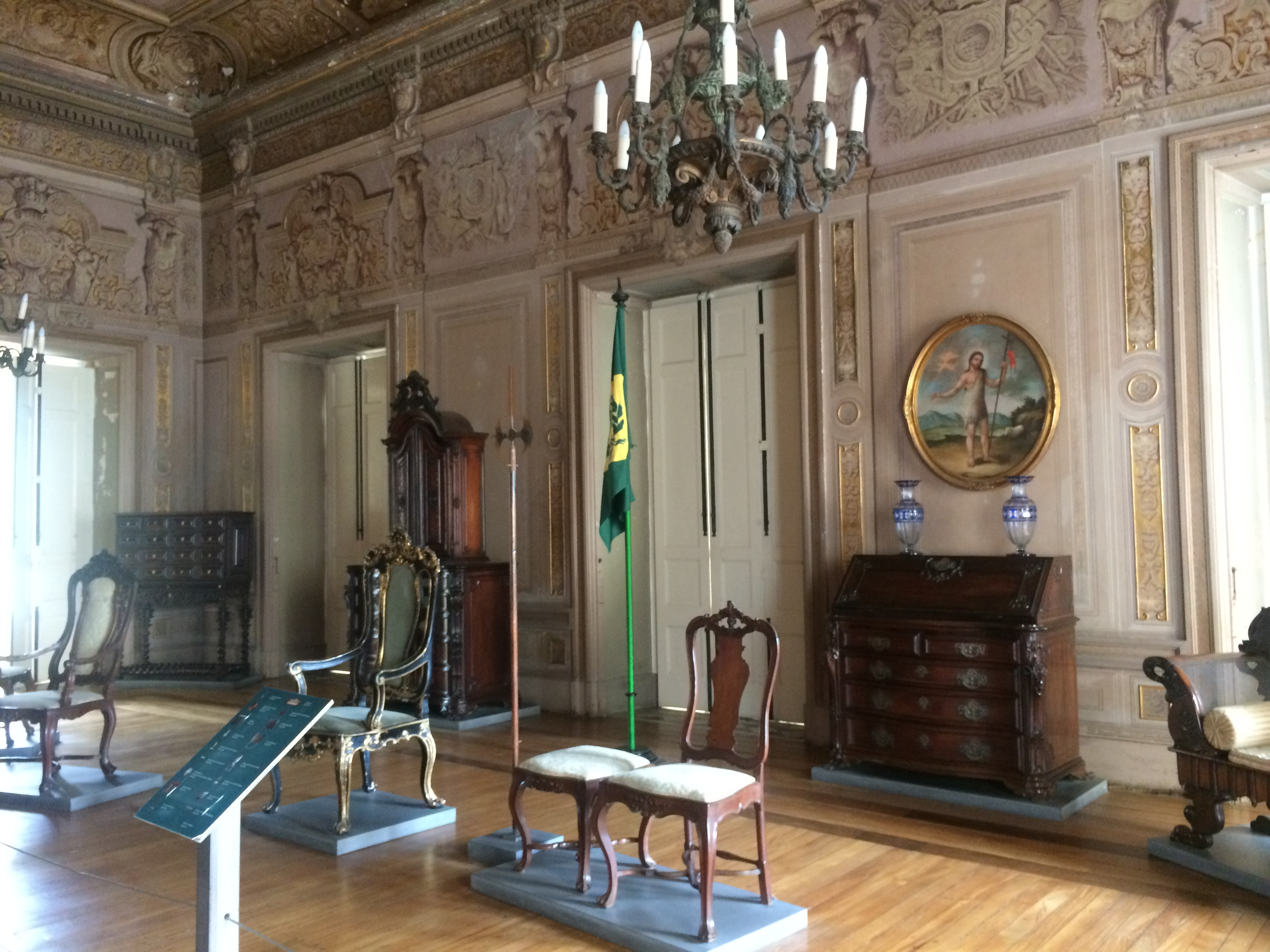
Throne Room

Founded in 1818 by King John VI of Portugal, the National Museum was transferred to the old Imperial Palace of São Cristóvão in 1892. During its long history, its collections have been greatly expanded by acquisitions and donations, including by Emperor Pedro II, a great sponsor of the sciences. The collections included Astronomy (mostly meteorites), Palaeontology, Natural history, Ethnology (including many interesting works by Brazilian indigenous peoples) and Archaeology (mostly antiquities from ancient Egypt).

Much of the art collection displayed by the museum still consisted of what was gathered by Emperor Pedro II himself. In this manner, it reflects 19th-century views of anthropology, archeology and sciences in general.

Visitors could also see a few rooms of the ancient palace with its original painted and stucco decoration, like the Throne Room, the Ambassadors' Room and the room of Empress Teresa Cristina. These rooms still displayed a couple original pieces but were overall empty.

On 2 September 2018, the palace was devastated by an extensive fire. The damage to heritage assets have been reported to be "incalculable". One of the few known surviving major artifacts is the Bendegó meteorite. After the fire, a metallic roof covering 5,000 m^{2} upper the debris was built.

== Gallery ==
=== Historic timeline of construction ===
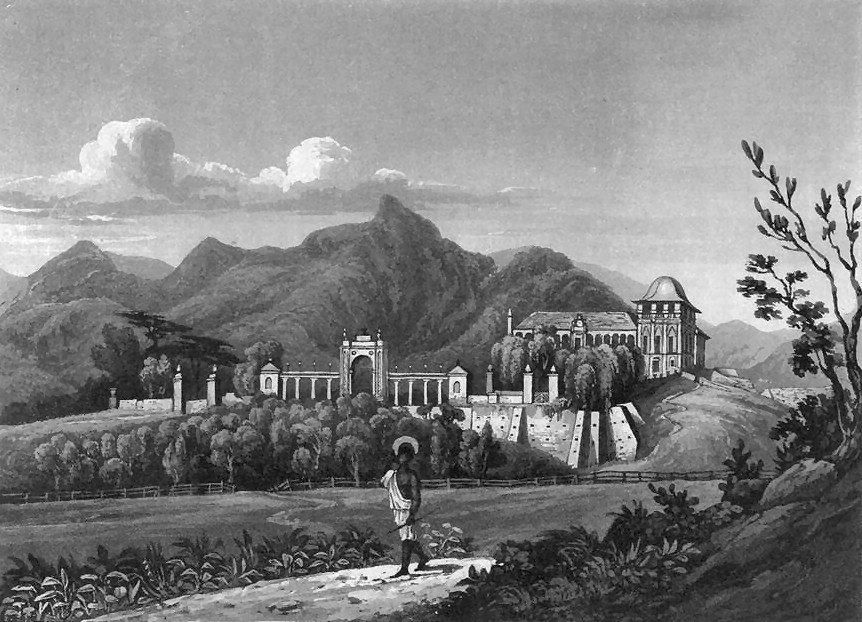
Palace in the early 19th century, before the Neoclassical intervention

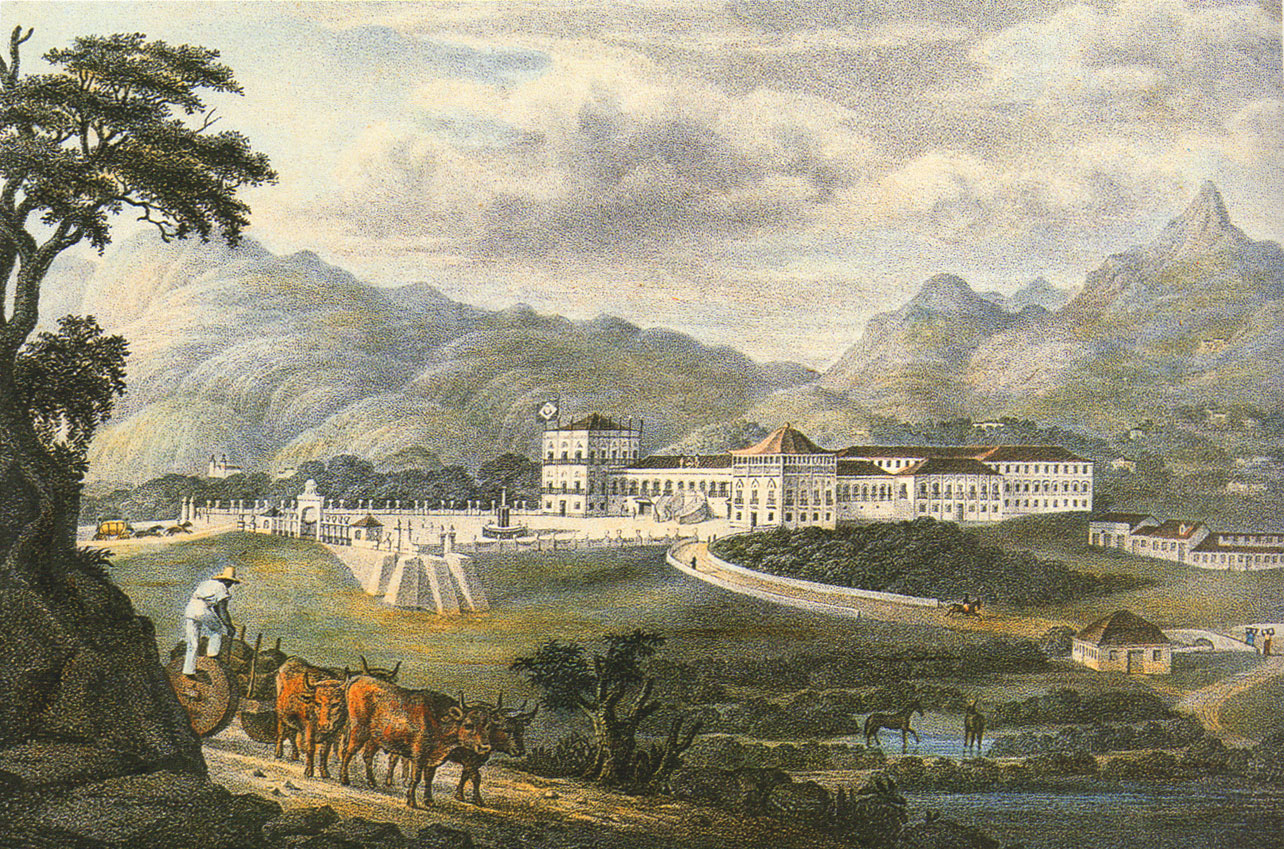
Painting of the Imperial Palace (1835–1840)

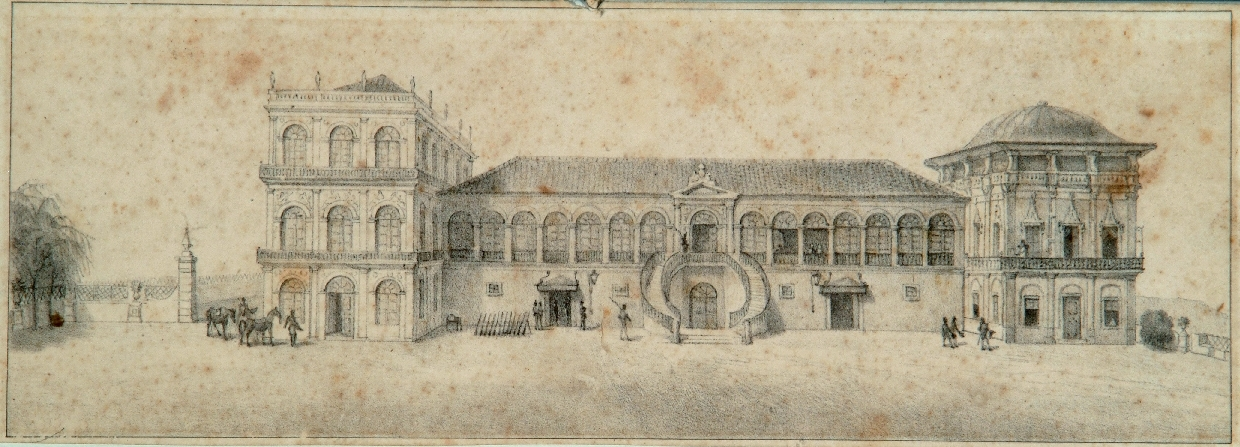
Antique illustration of the palace, by Jean-Baptiste Debret (1768–1848)

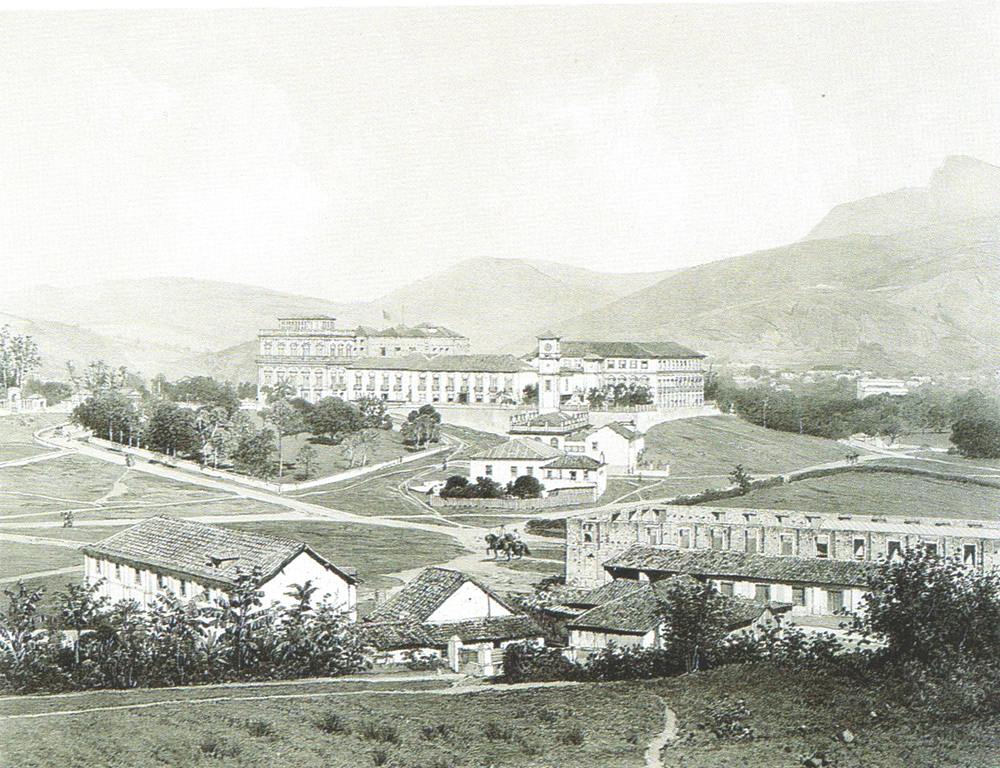
1858–1861

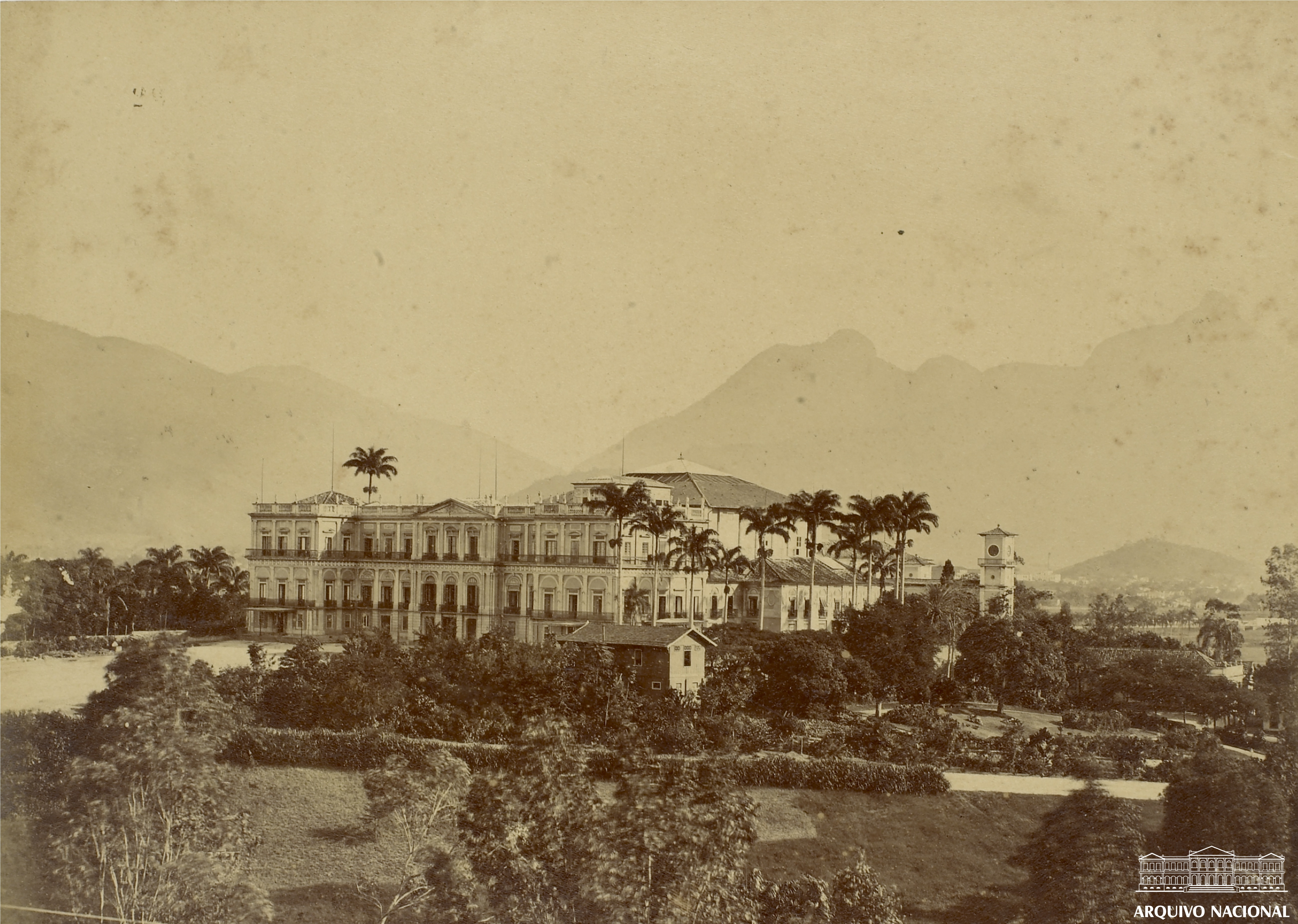
The Palace in the late 19th century, after the Neoclassical intervention

Emperor Pedro I's coffin arriving at the palace for public exhibition, 1972

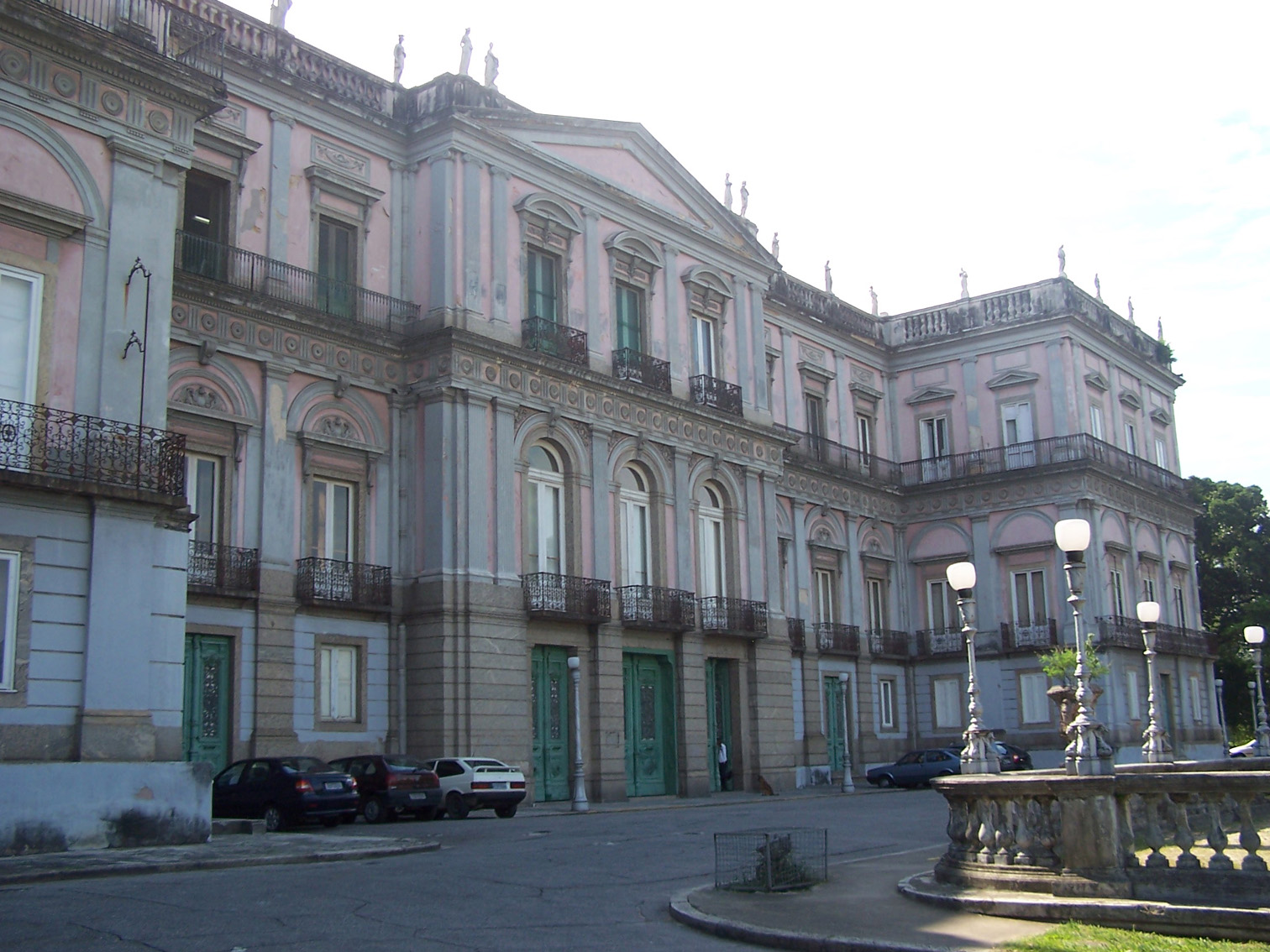
Old pink paint

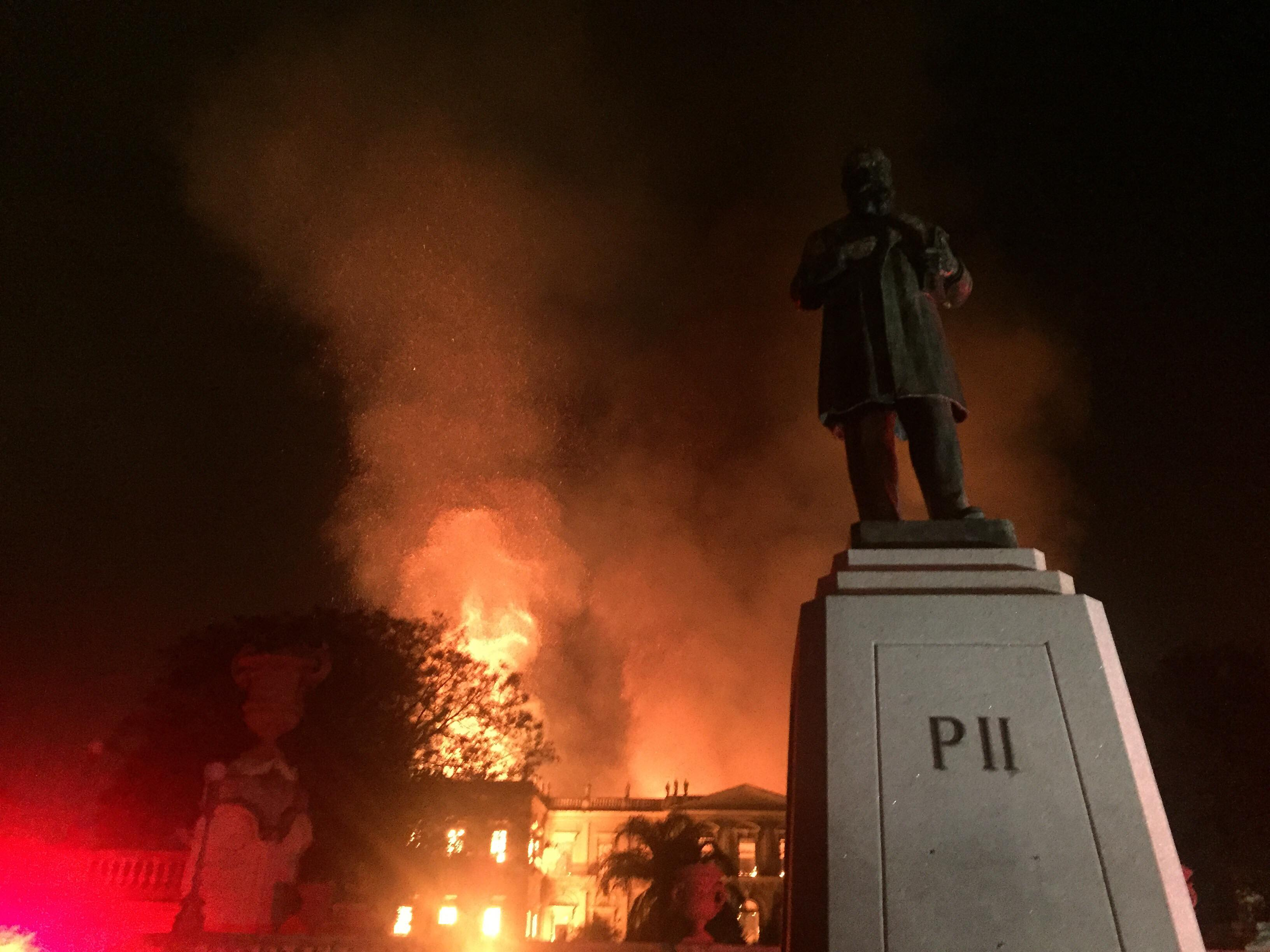
The palace in flames during the night of 2 September 2018, leaving it in ruin

=== Exterior before the 2018 fire ===
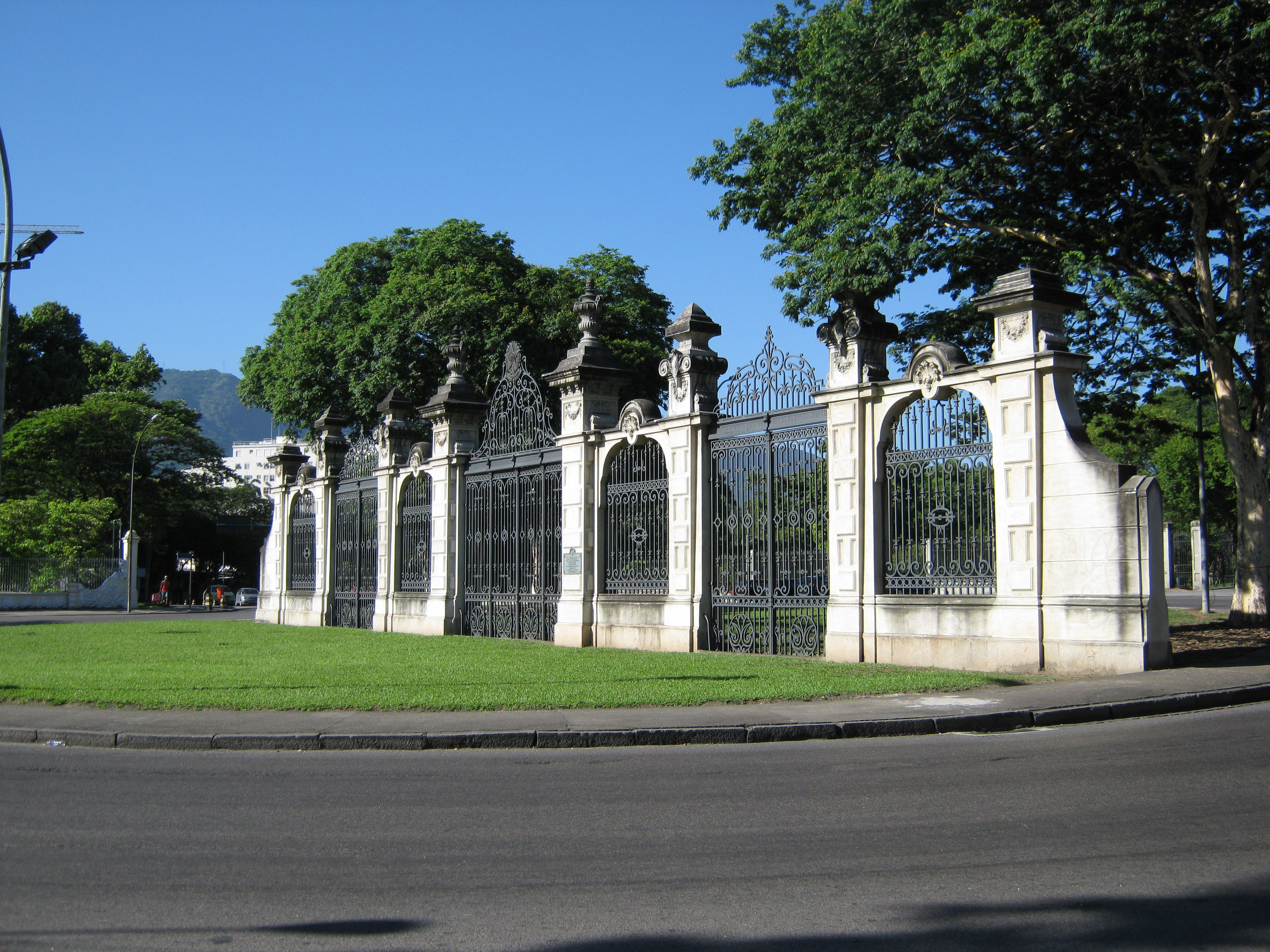
Gates of the former main entrance

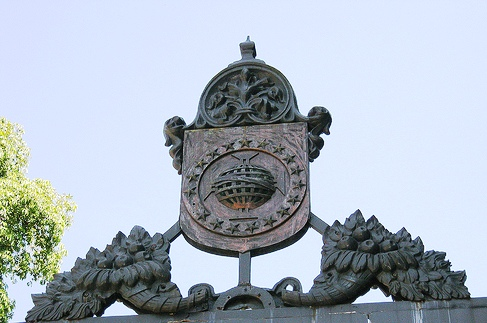
Imperial coat of arms

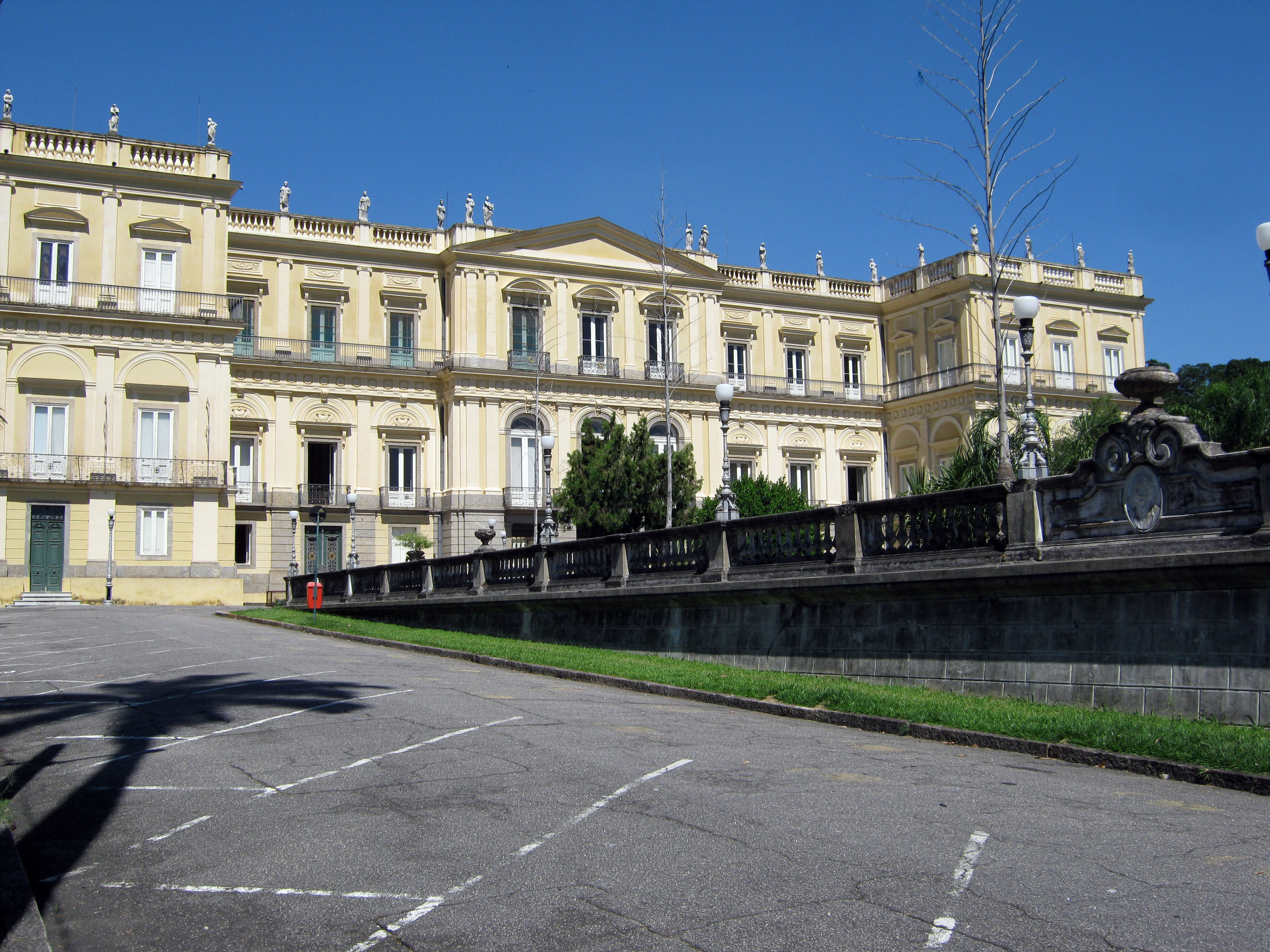
View from parking lot

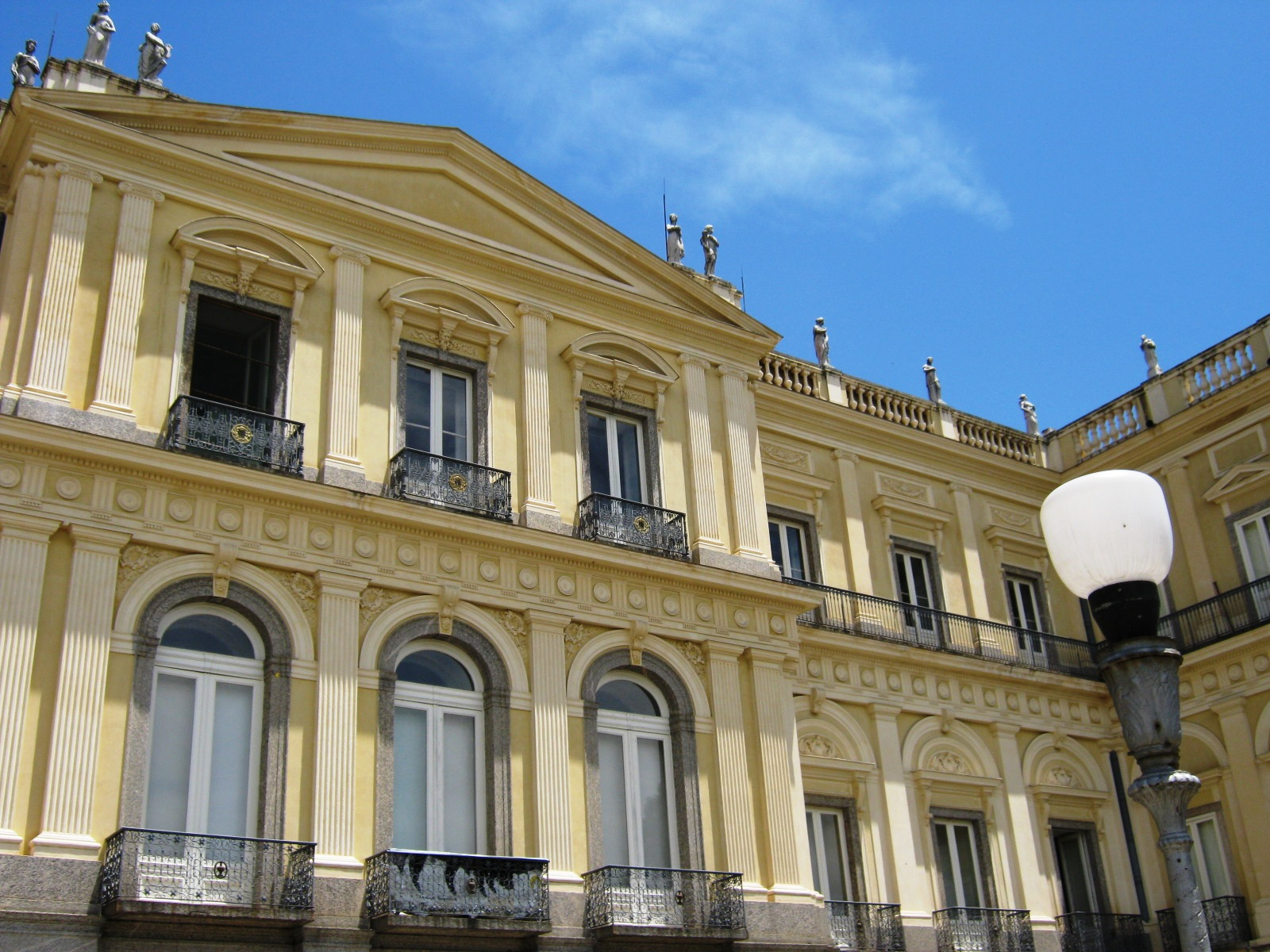
Facade

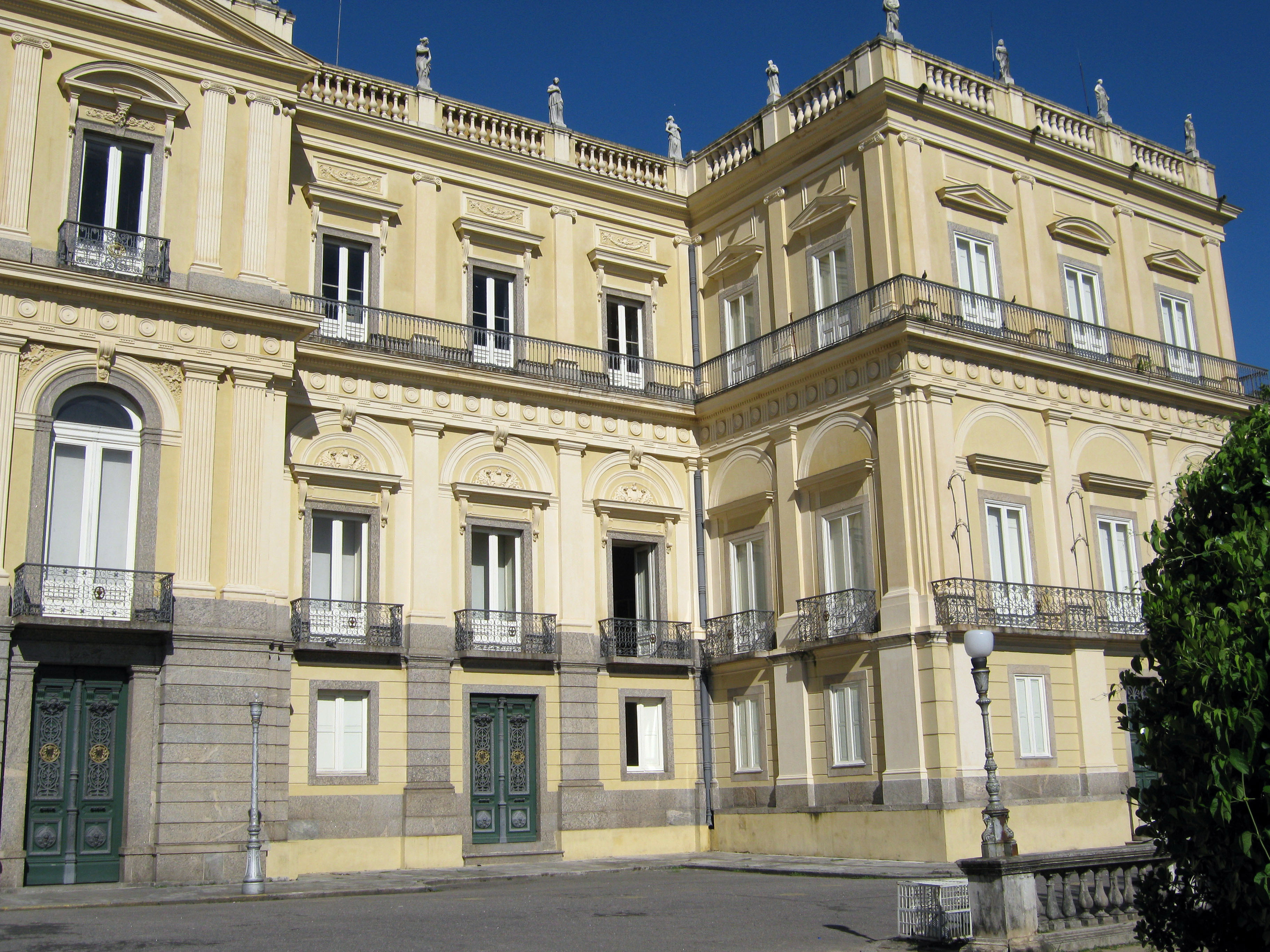
The palace seen from the garden

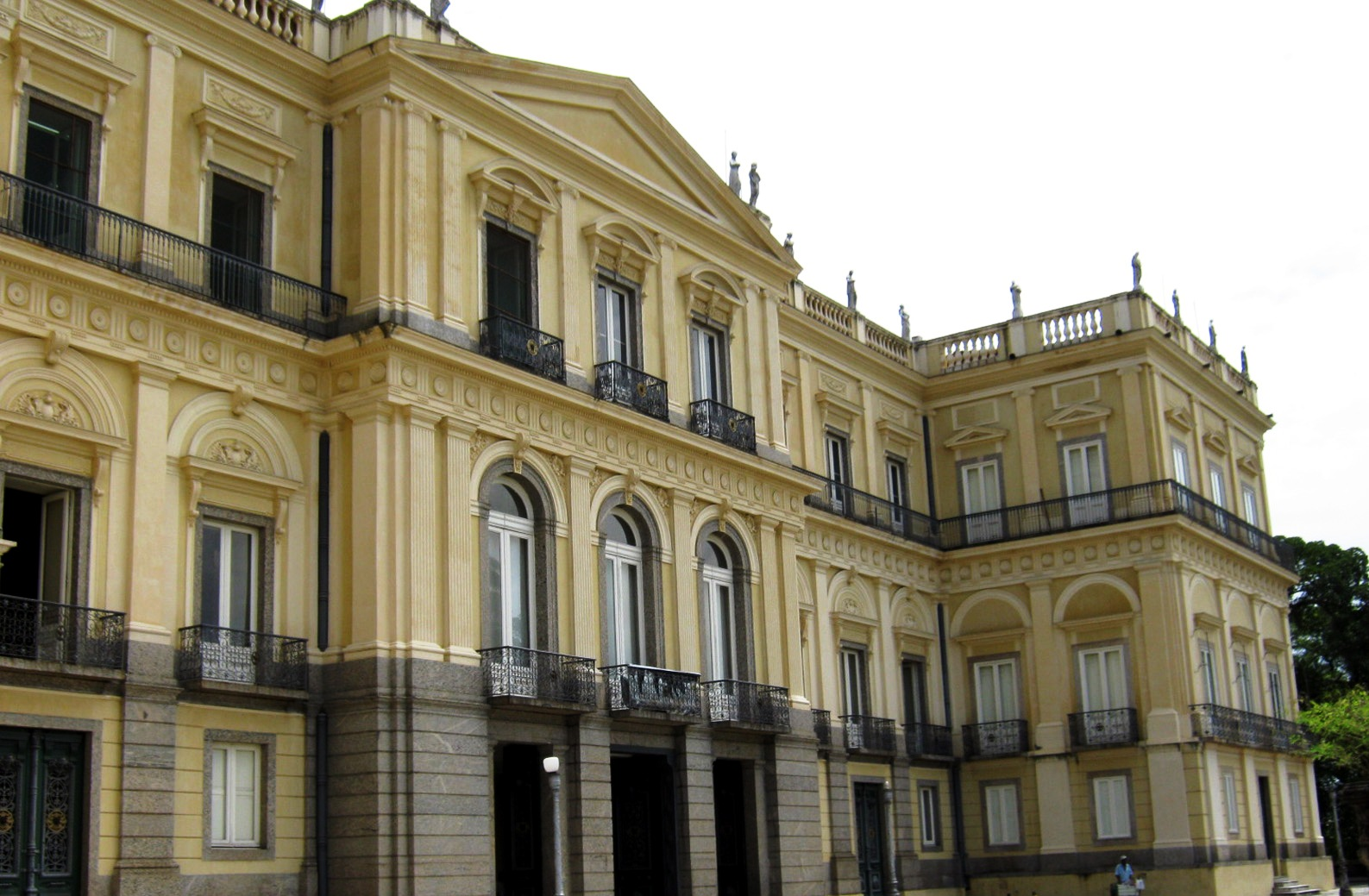
Side front view

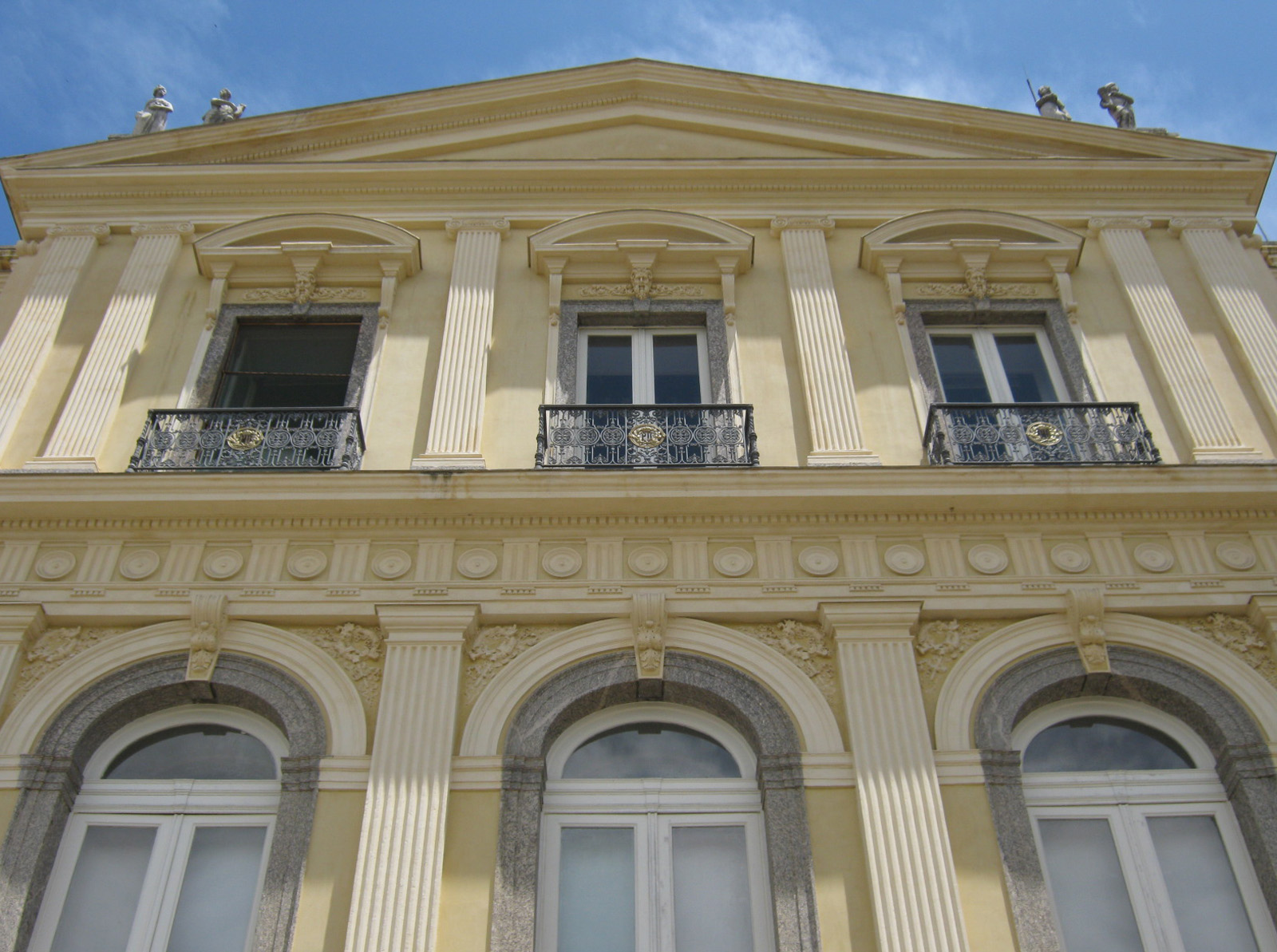
Central view

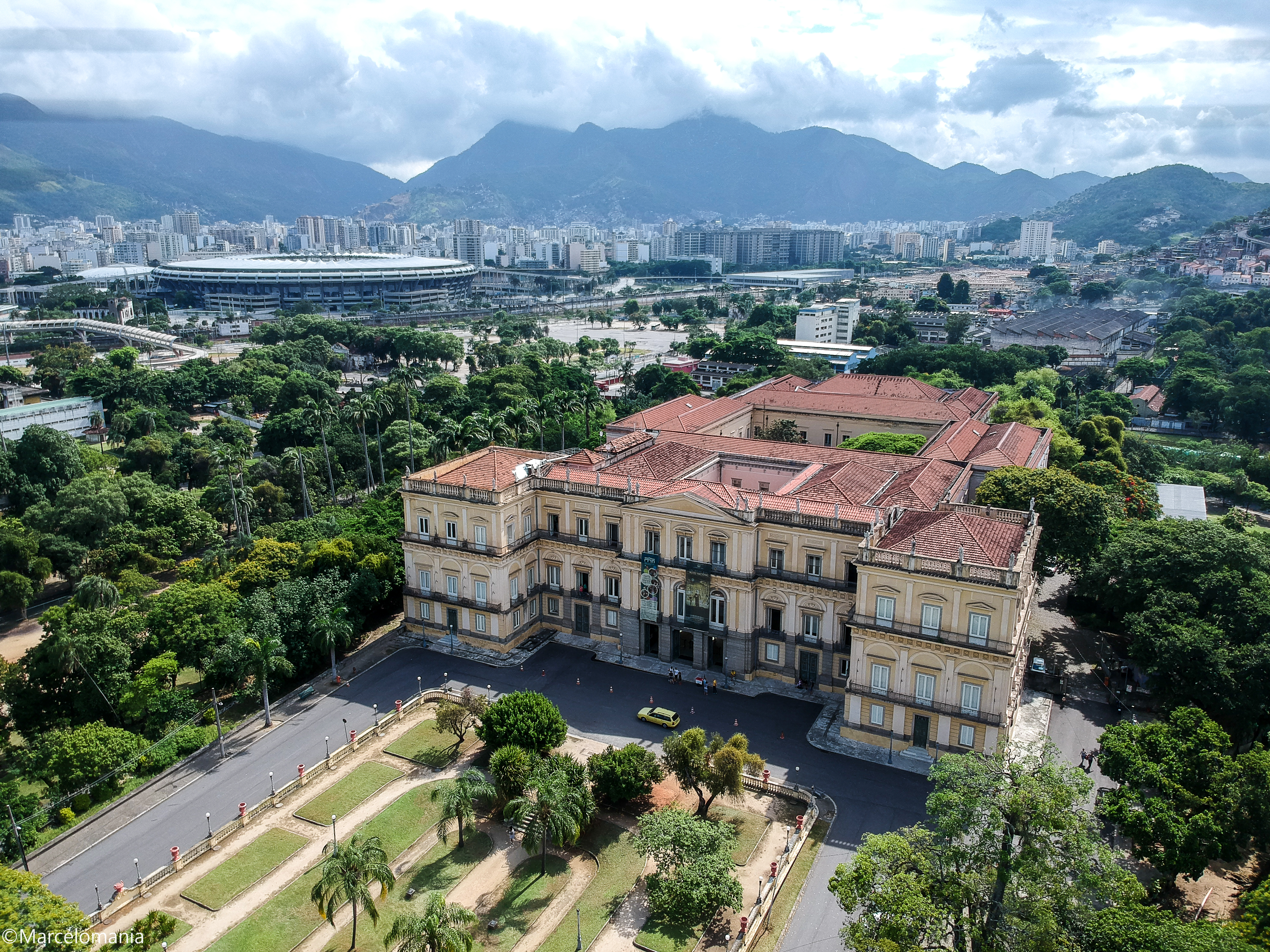
The palace with Maracanã Stadium in the background

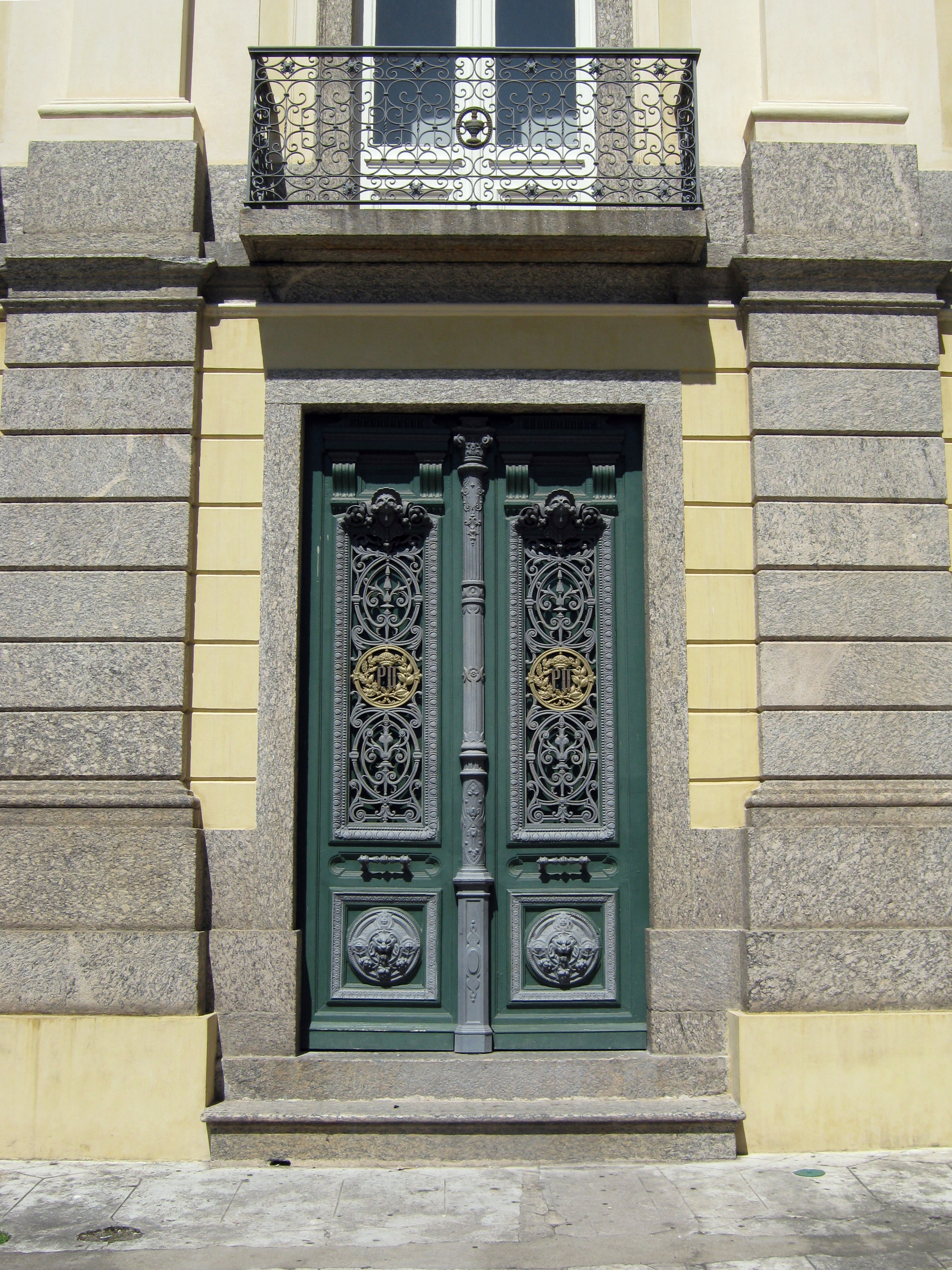
One of the many doors

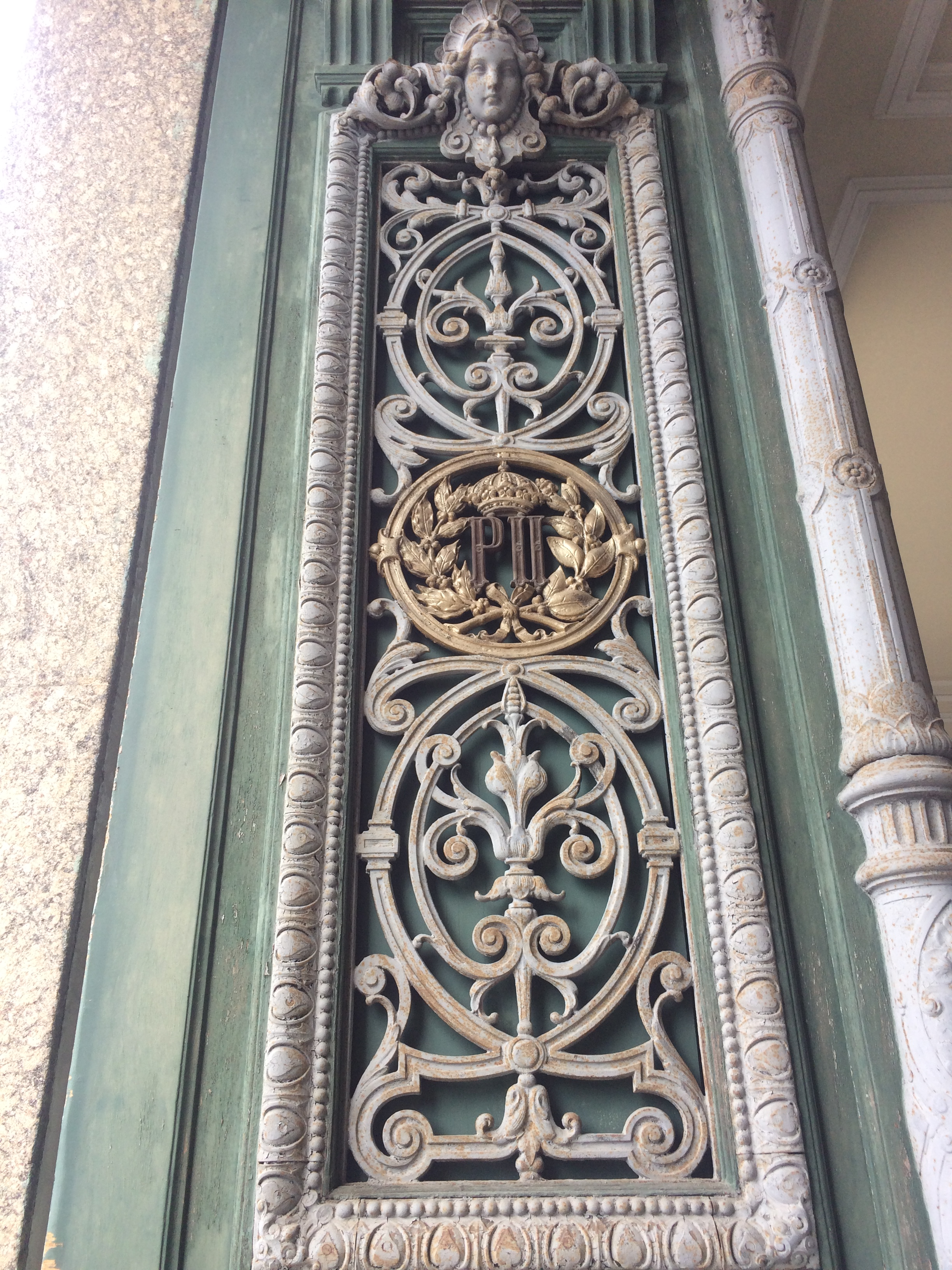
Detail of a door bearing the imperial cypher of Emperor Pedro II

=== Interior before the 2018 fire ===
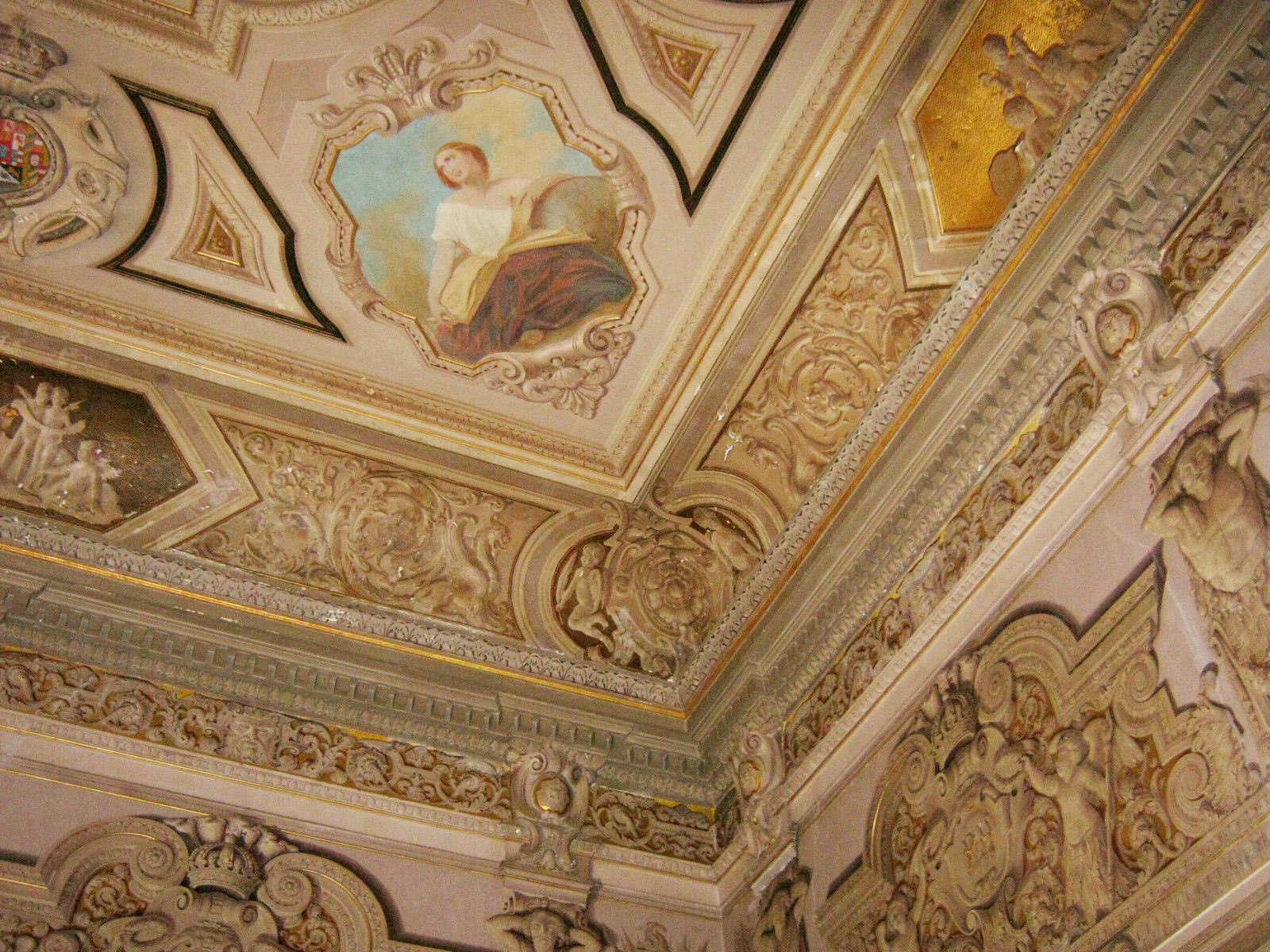
Ceiling detail

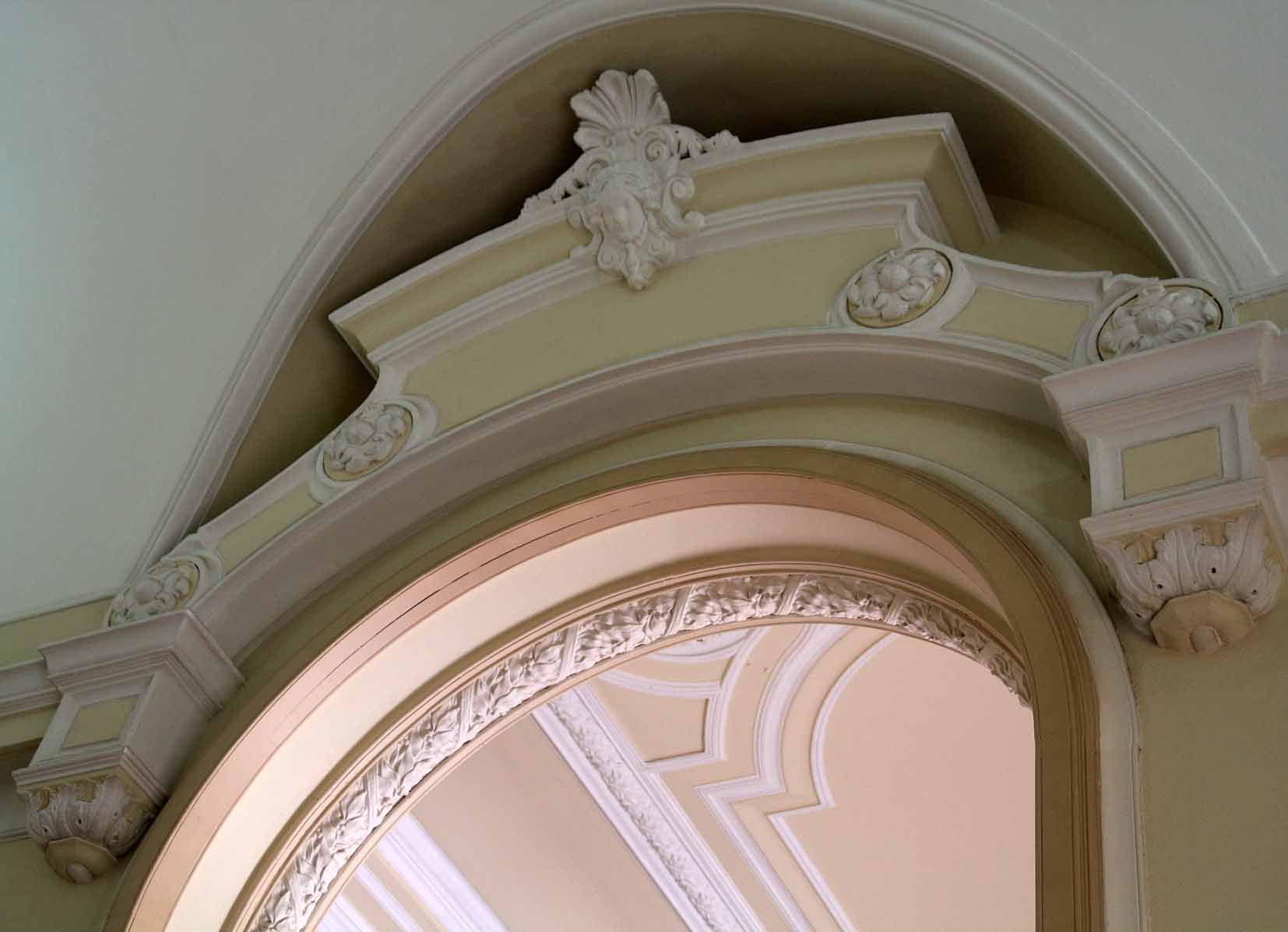
Internal details

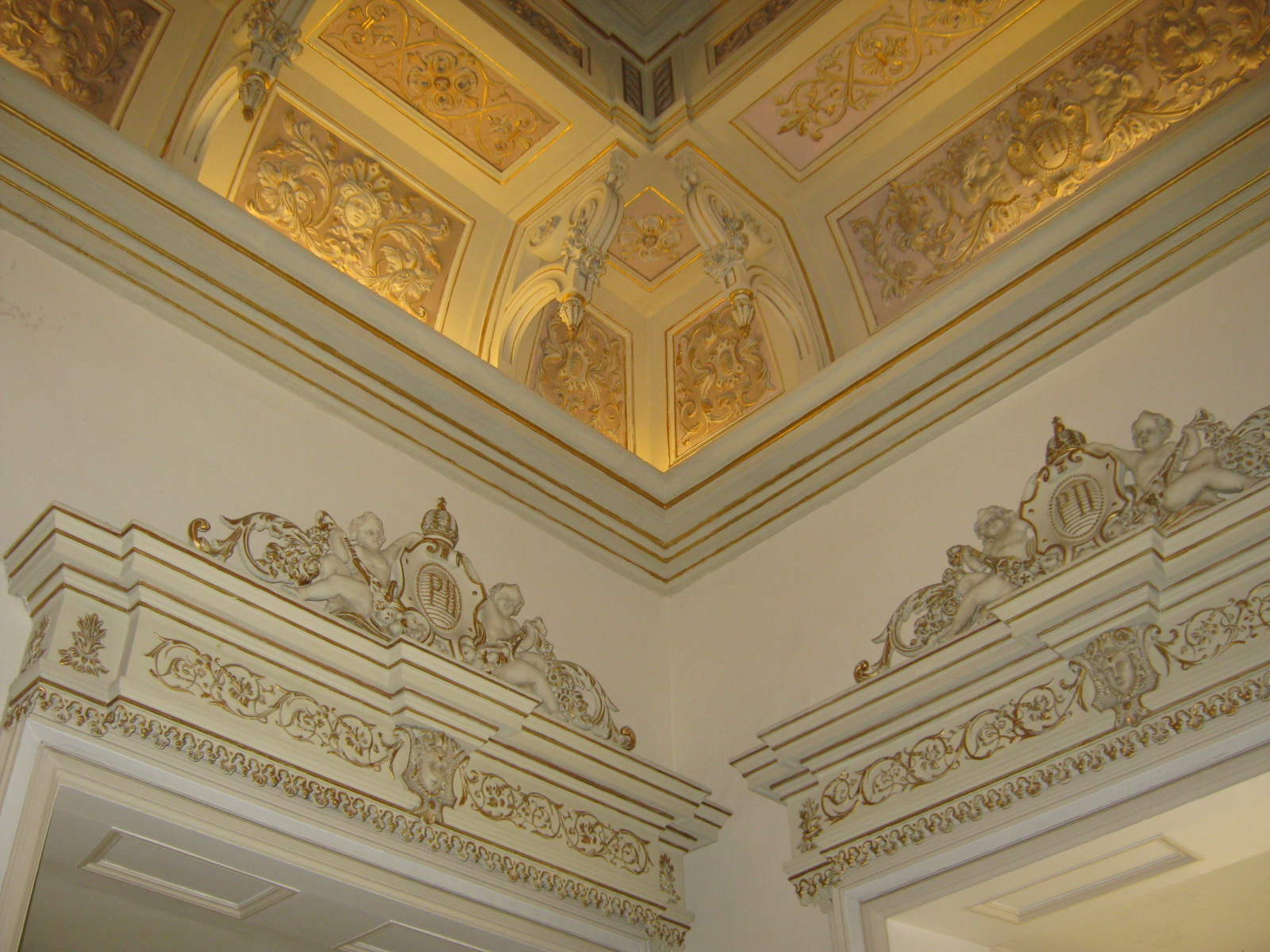
Walls and ceiling

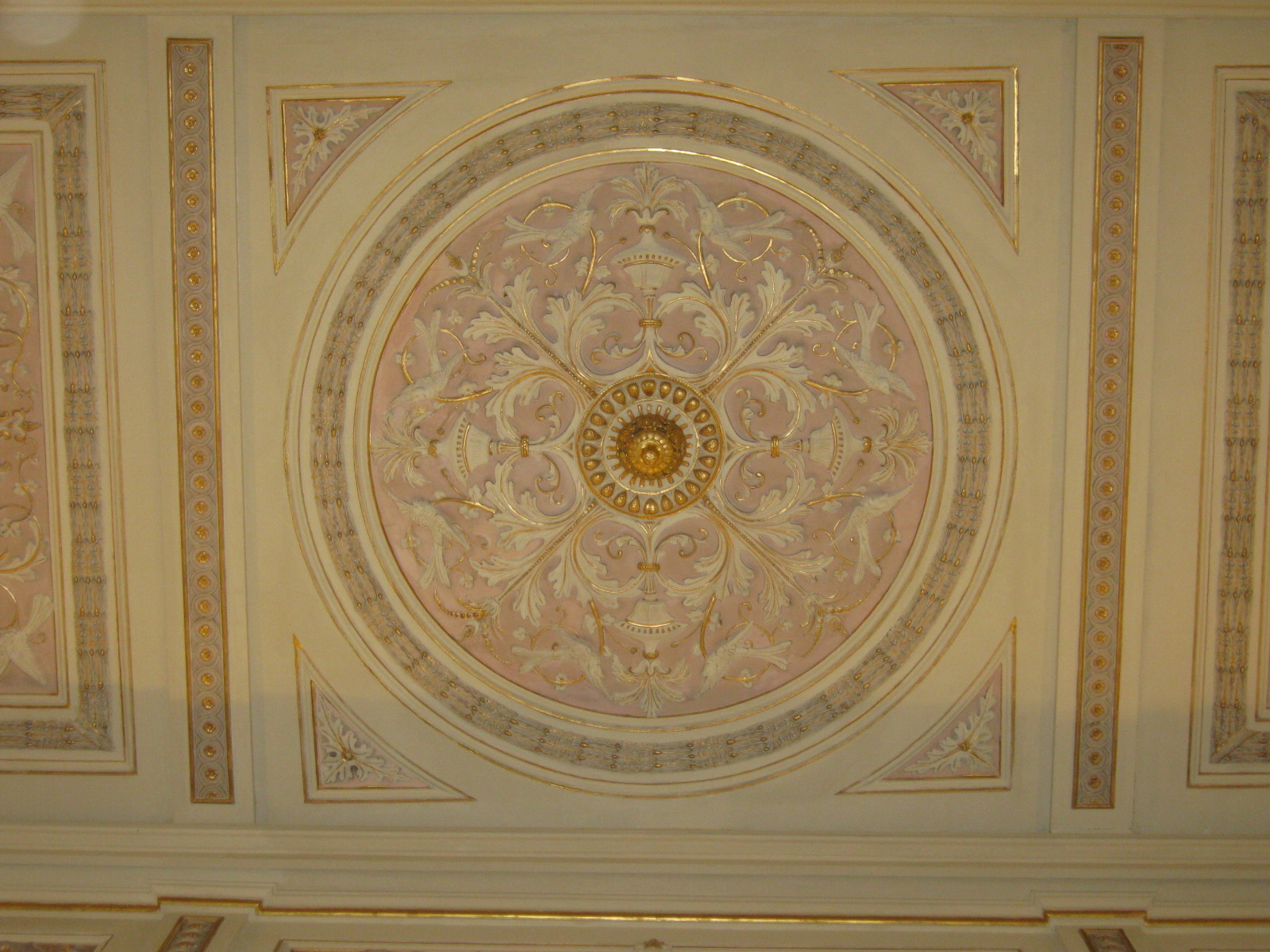
Ceiling

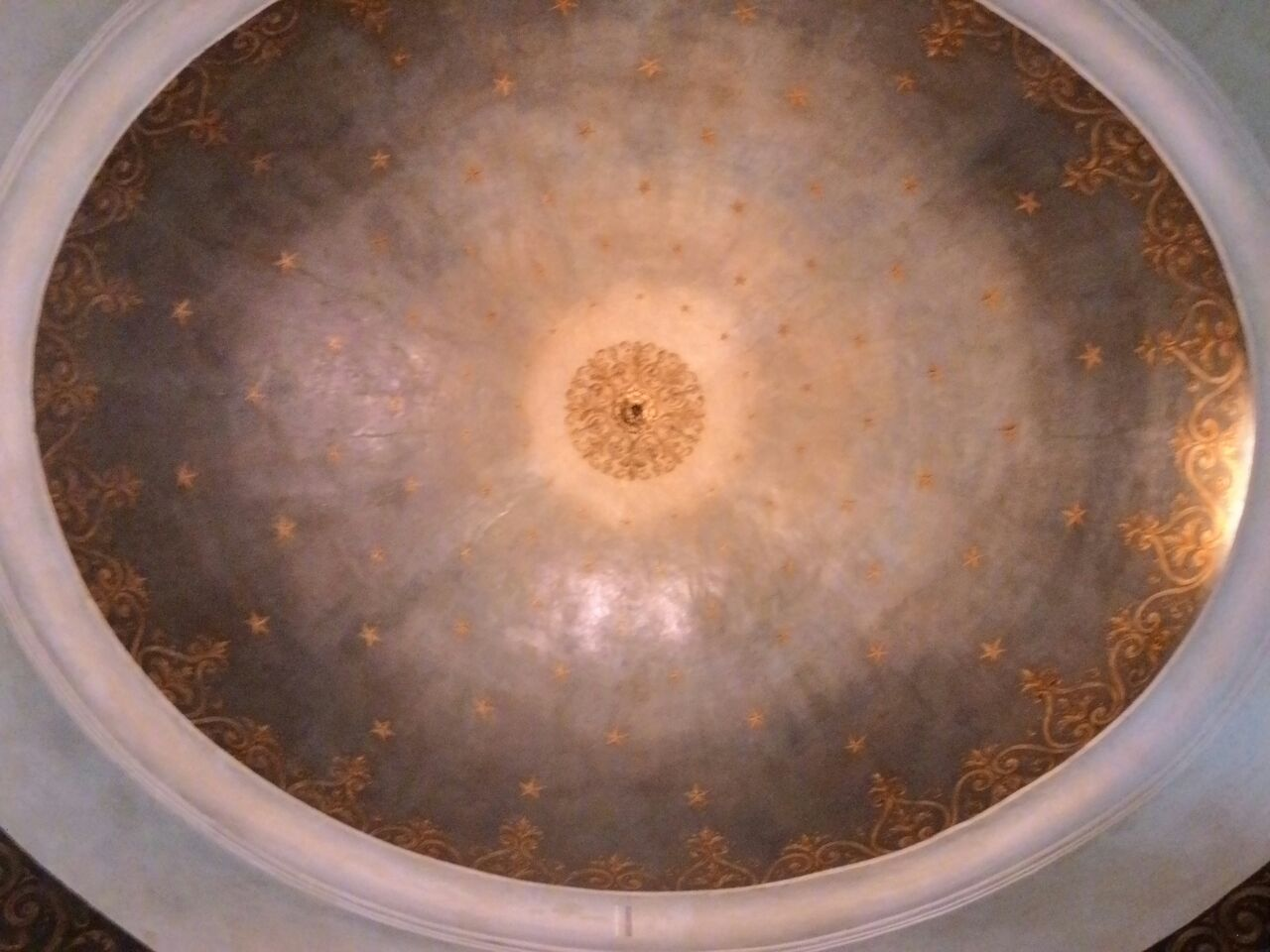
Ceiling

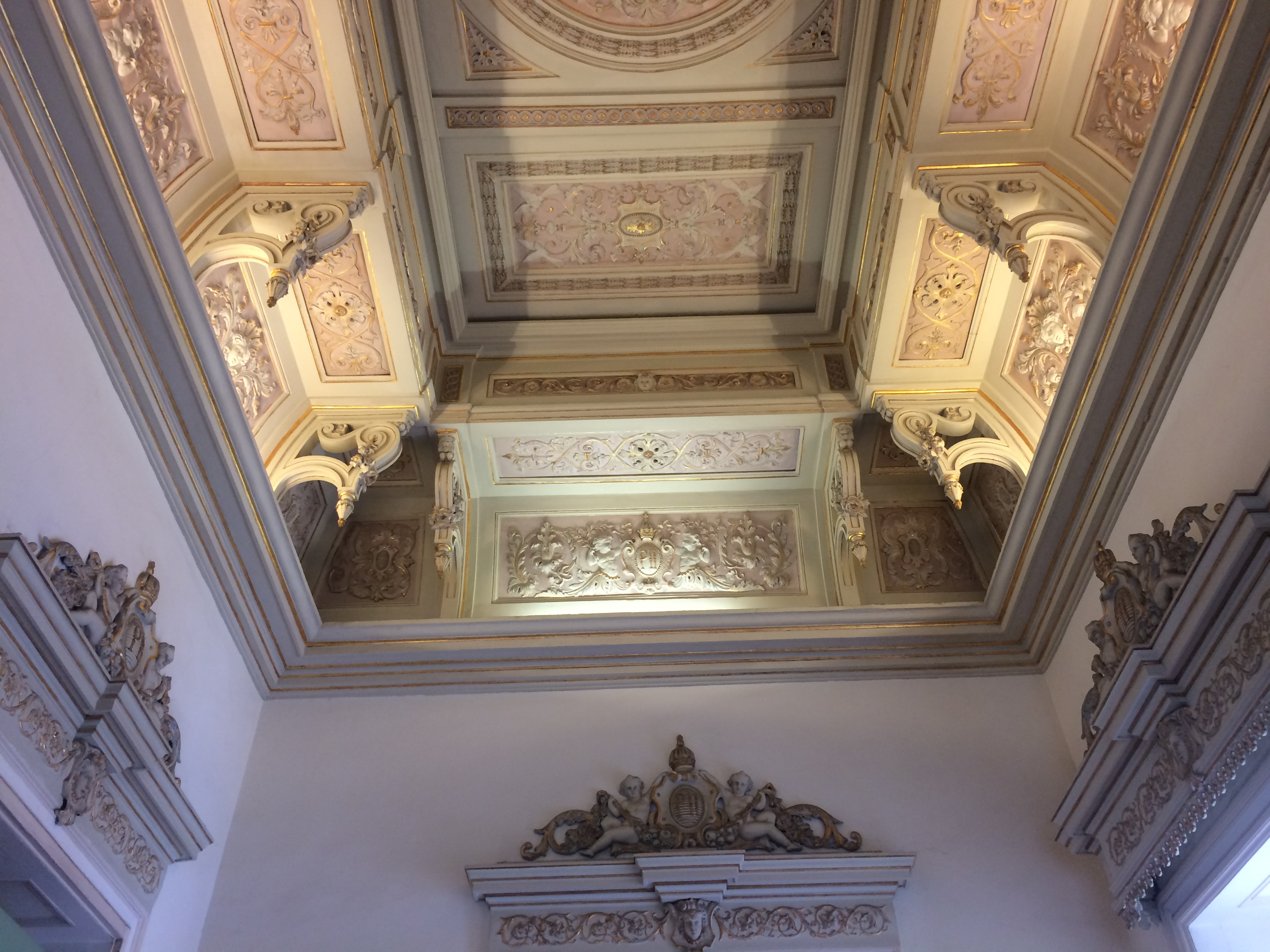
Ceiling

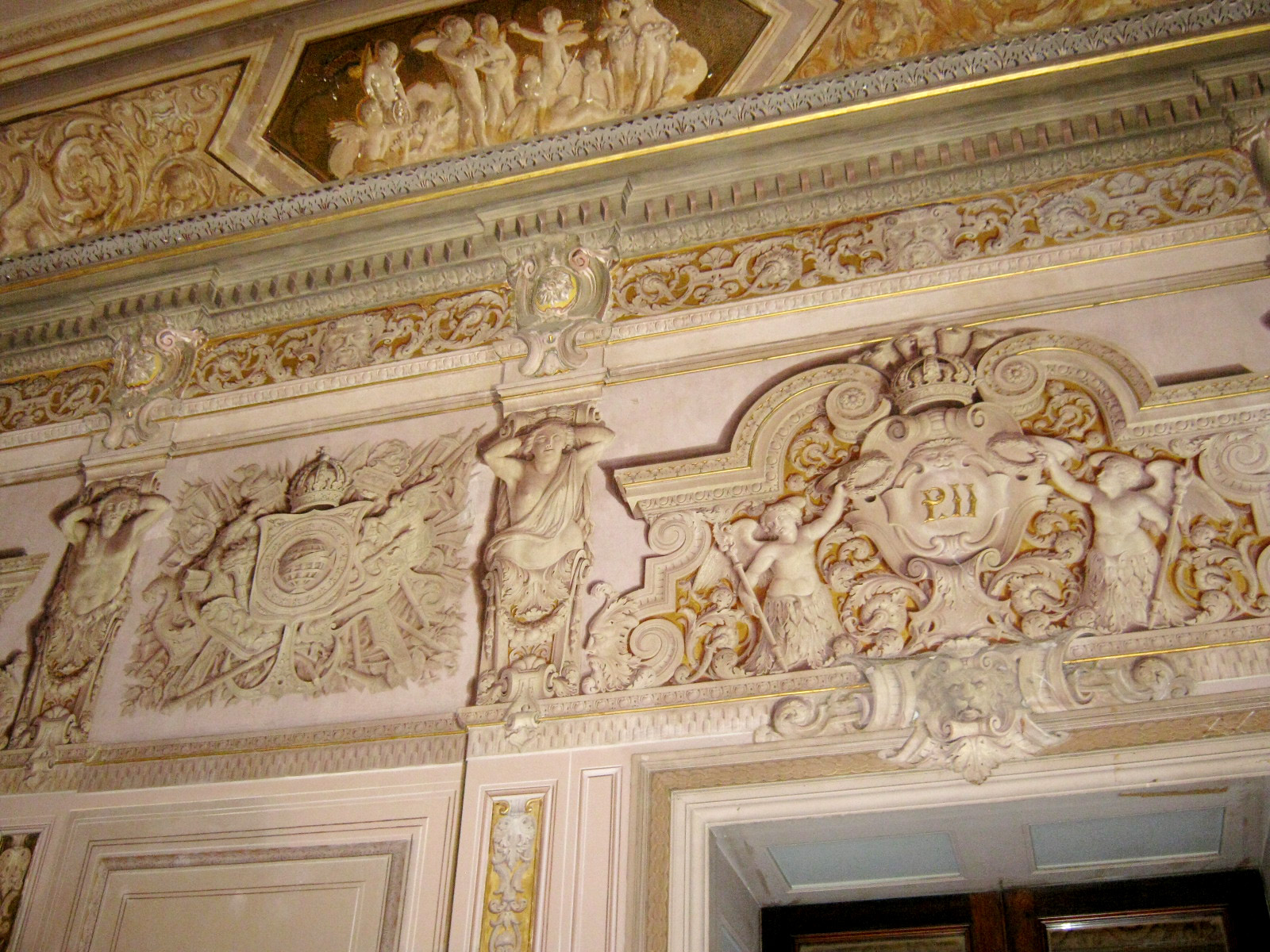
Ceiling

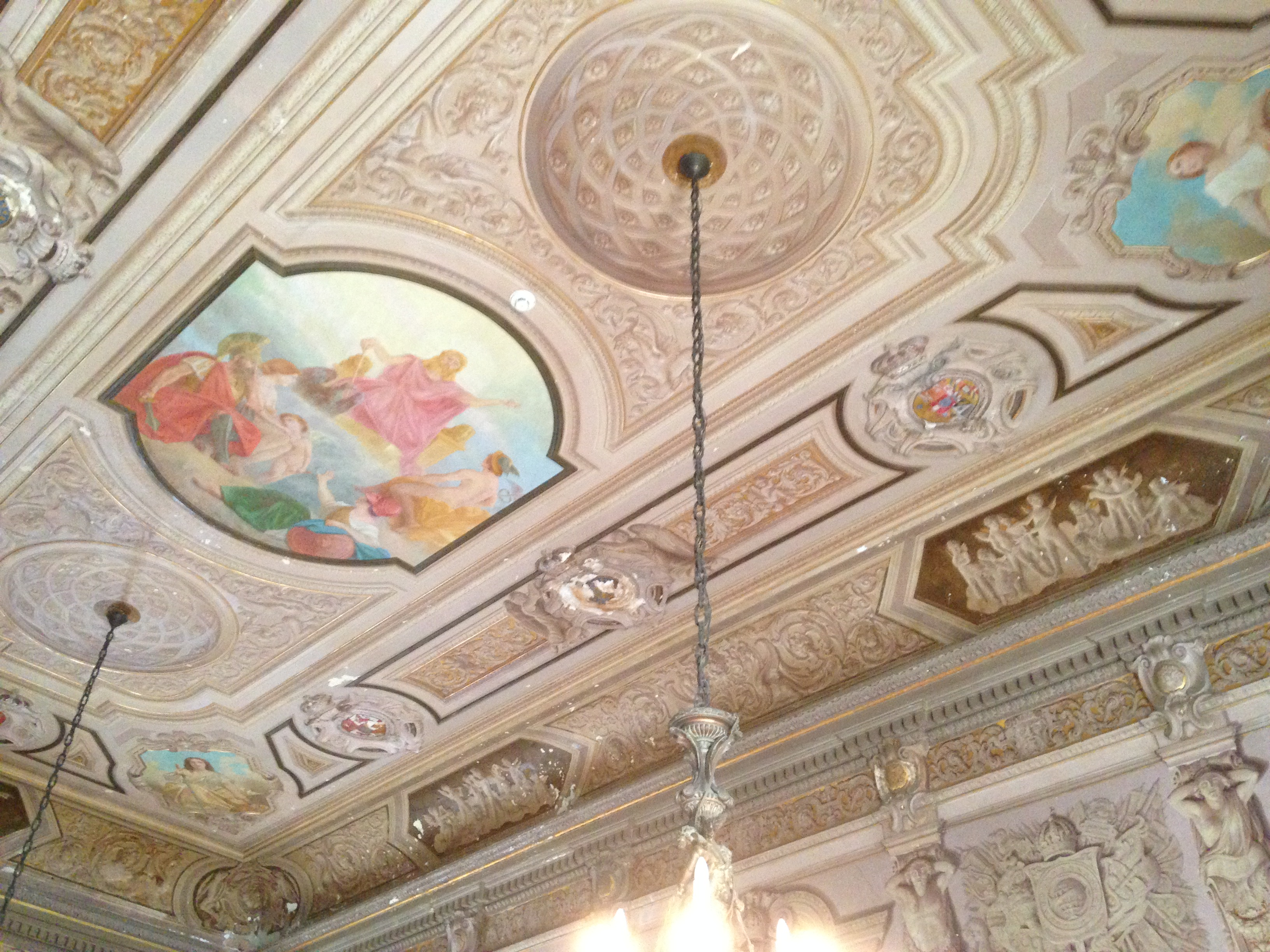
Ceiling

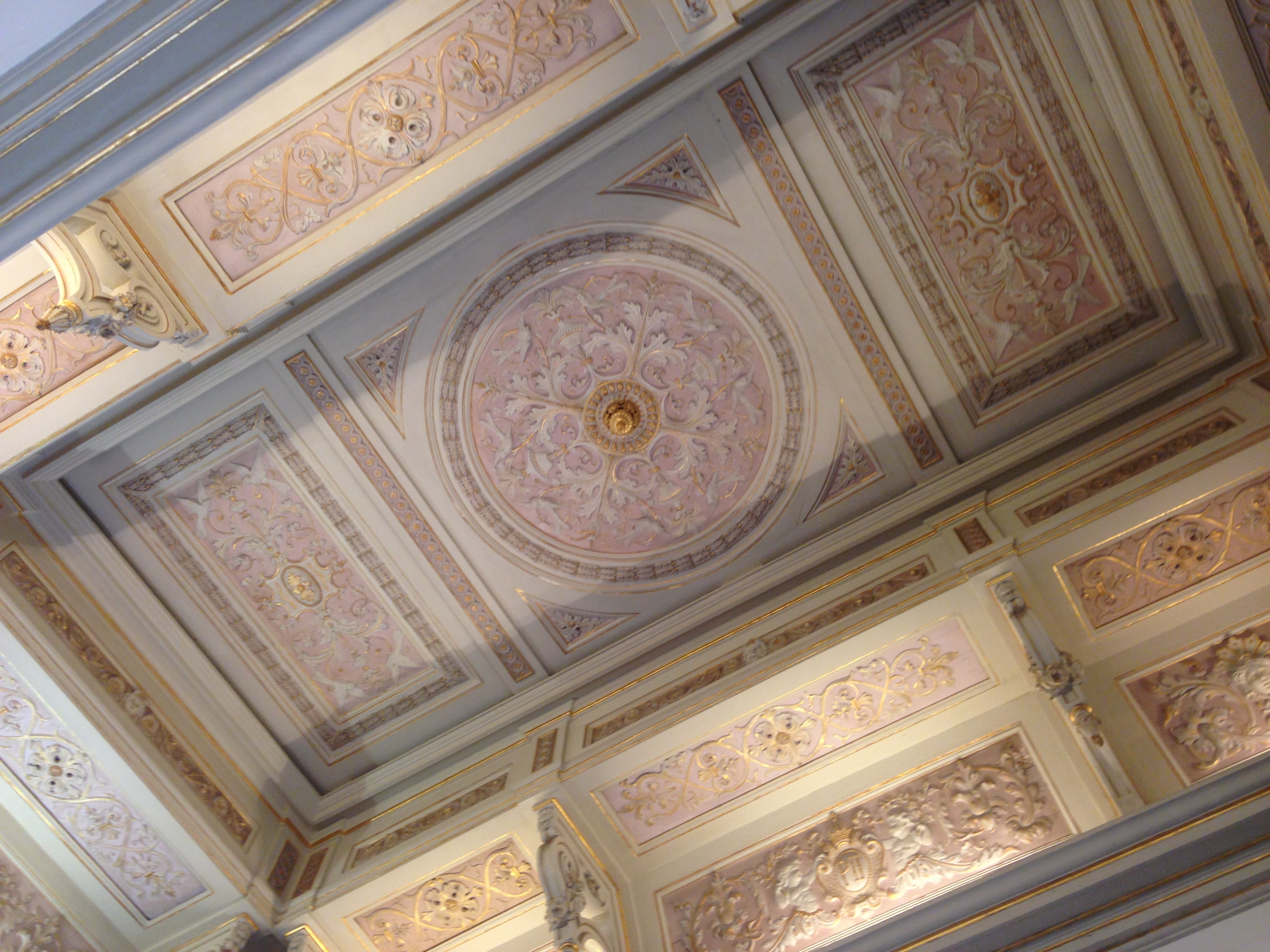
Ceiling

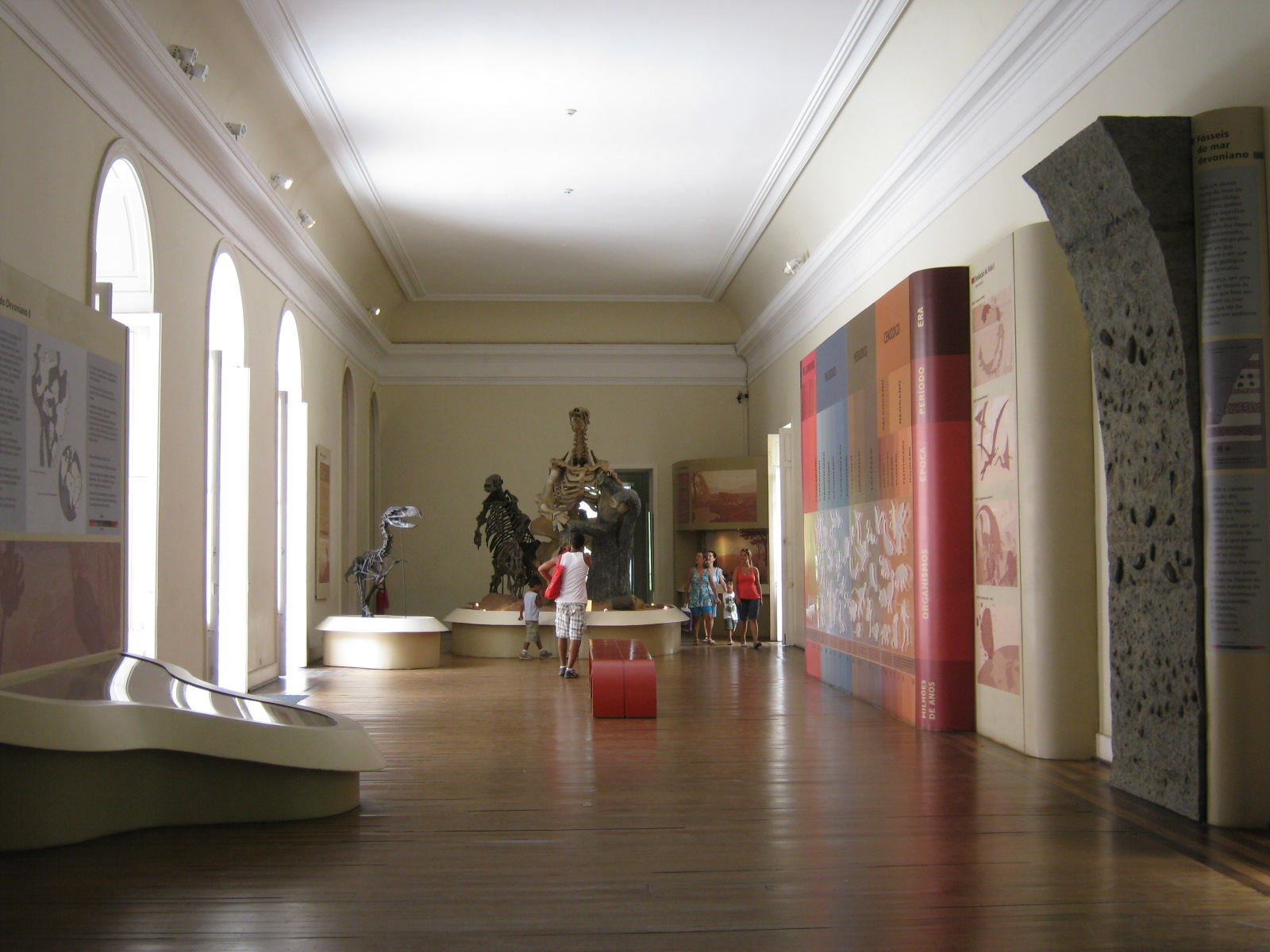
Room

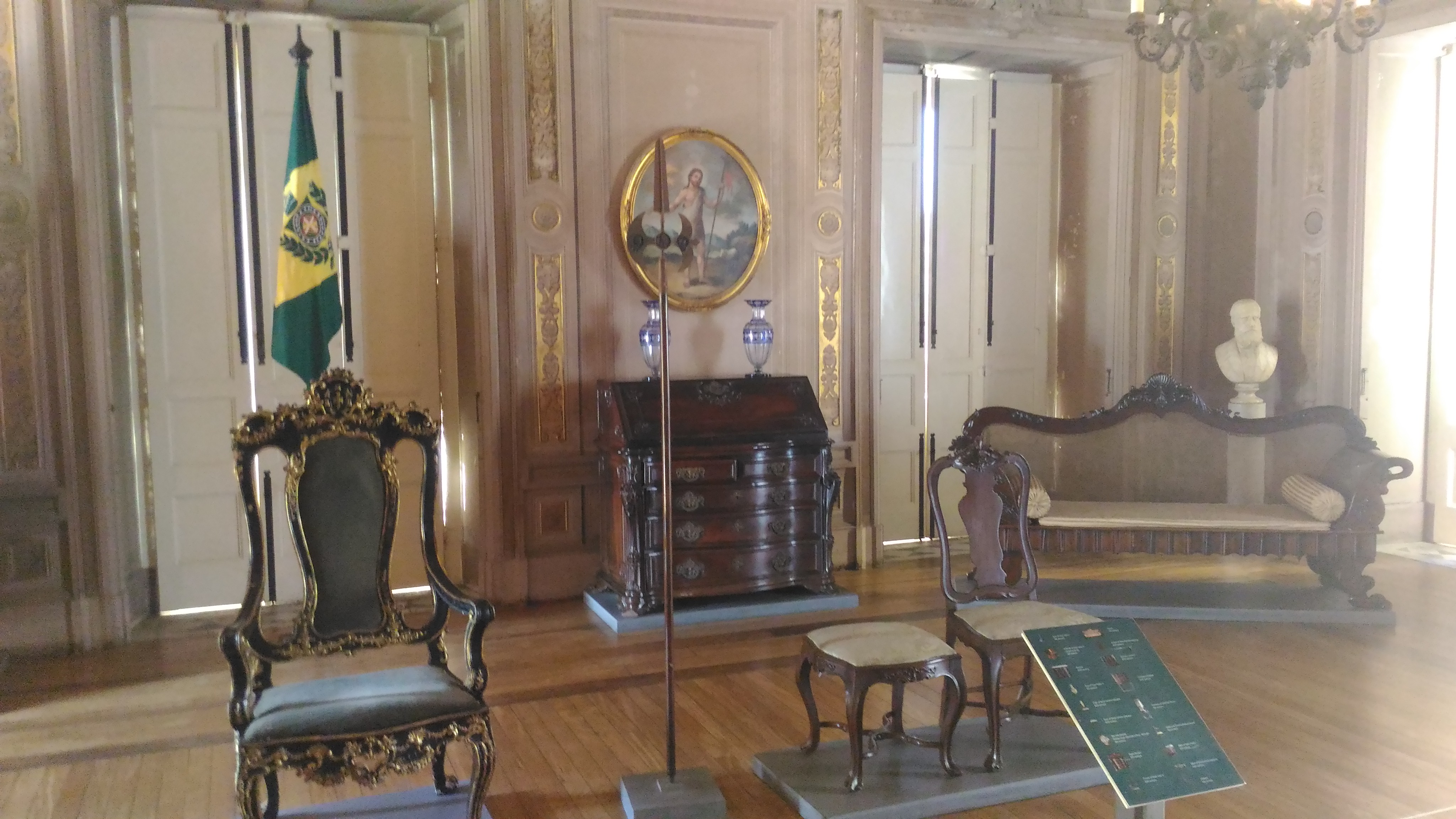
Throne of King John VI

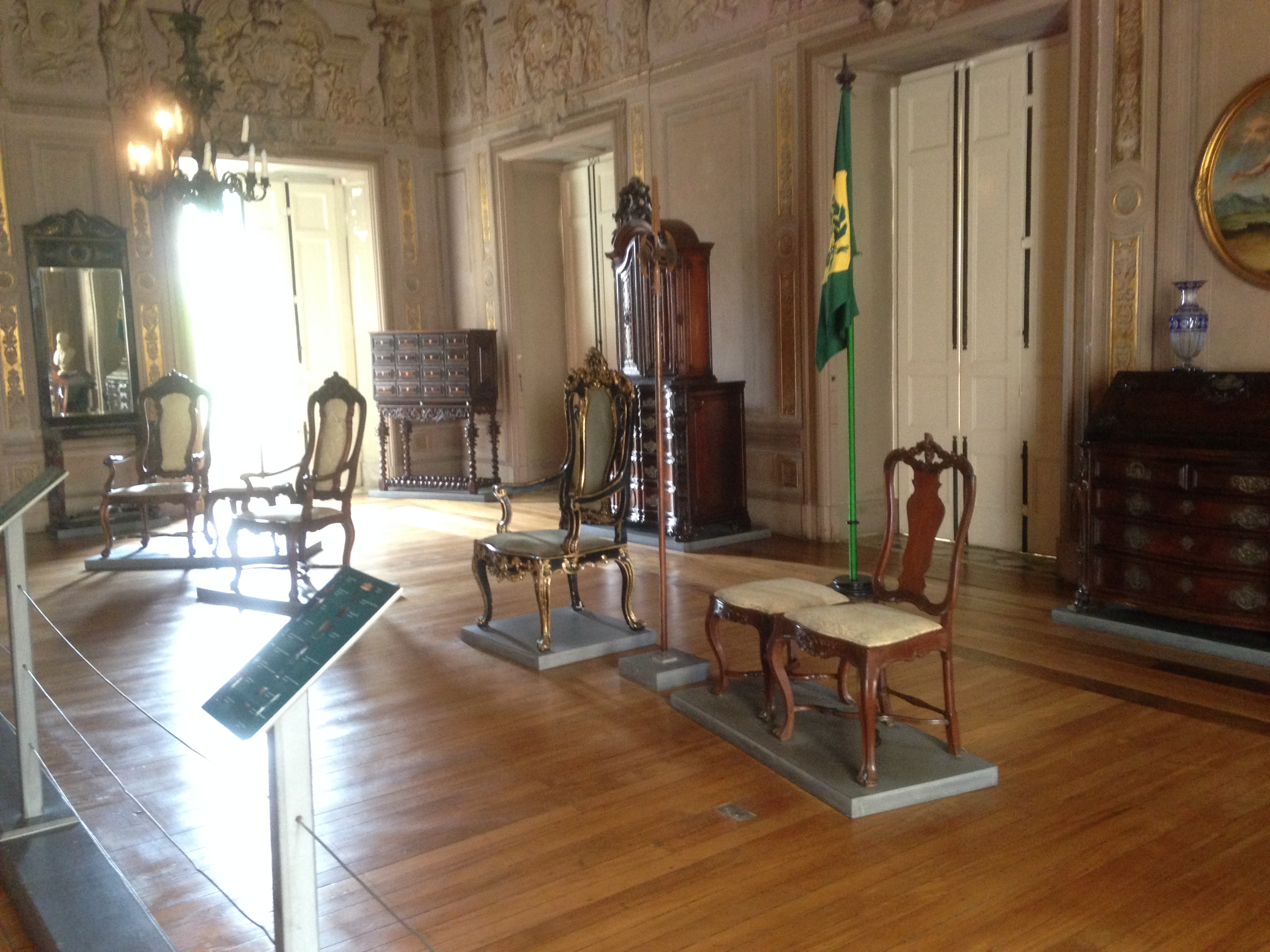
The former Throne Room

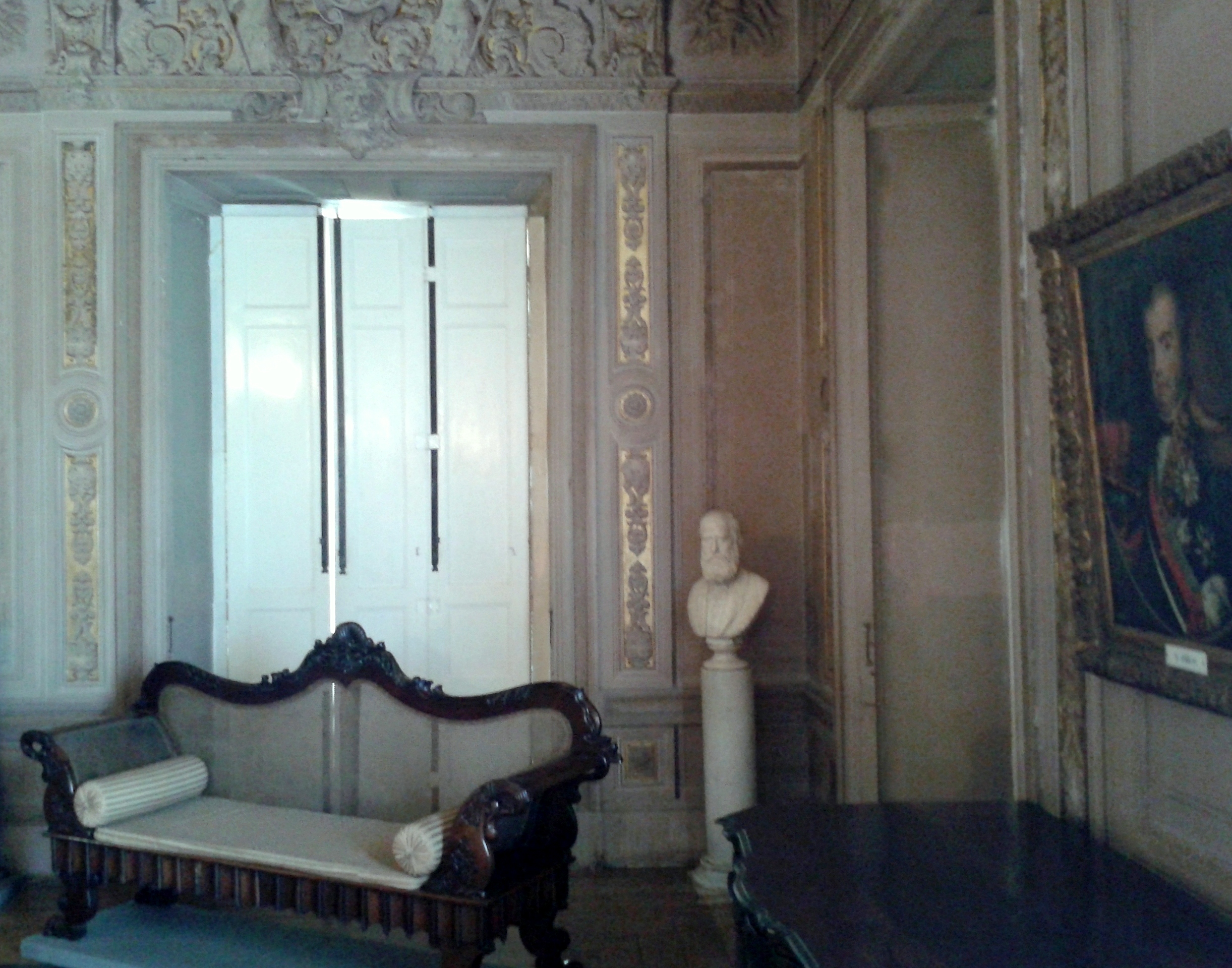
Throne Room details and a bust of Emperor Pedro II. On the wall at the right side of the picture, a portrait of King John VI

=== Grounds ===
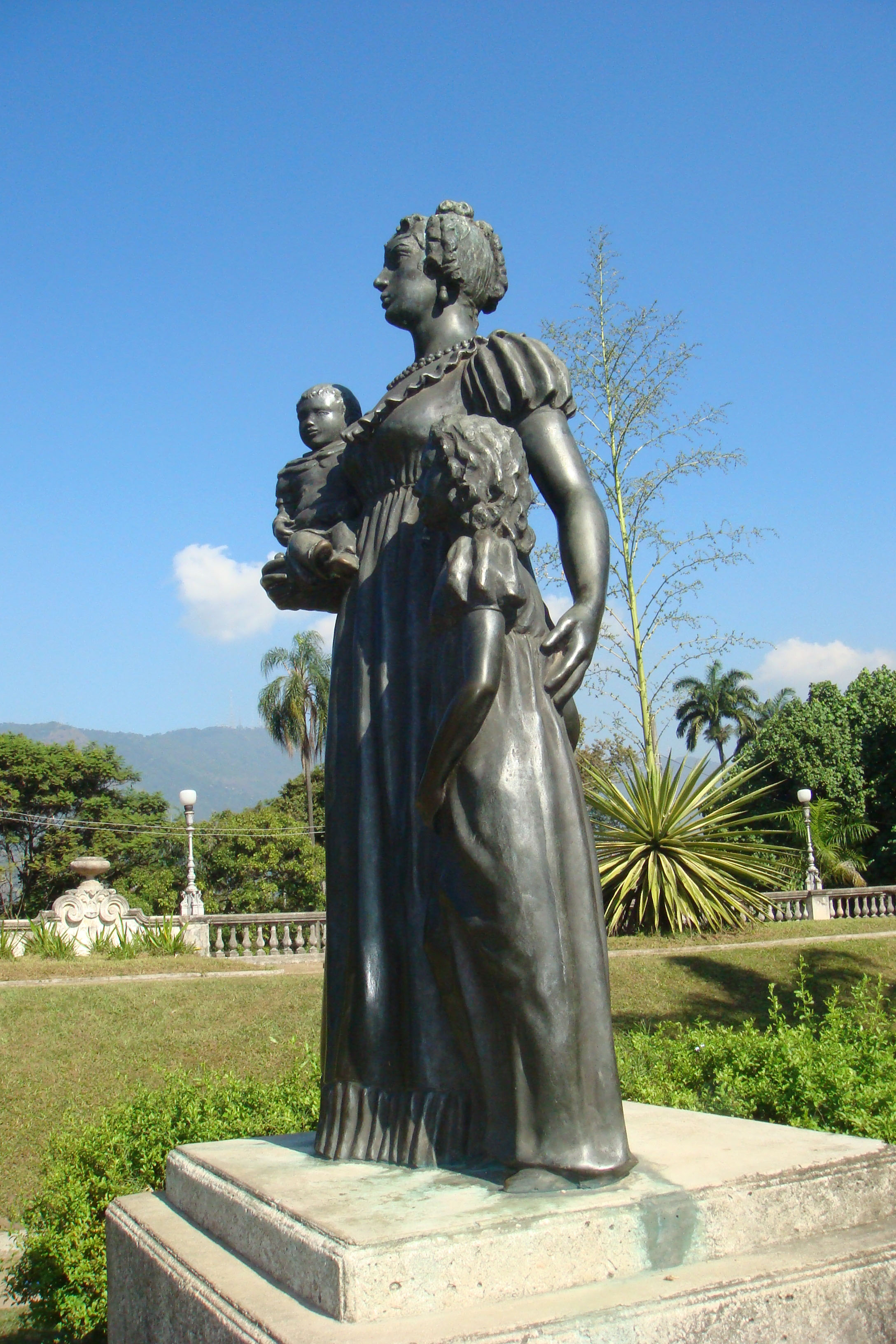
Statue of Empress Maria Leopoldina with two of her children

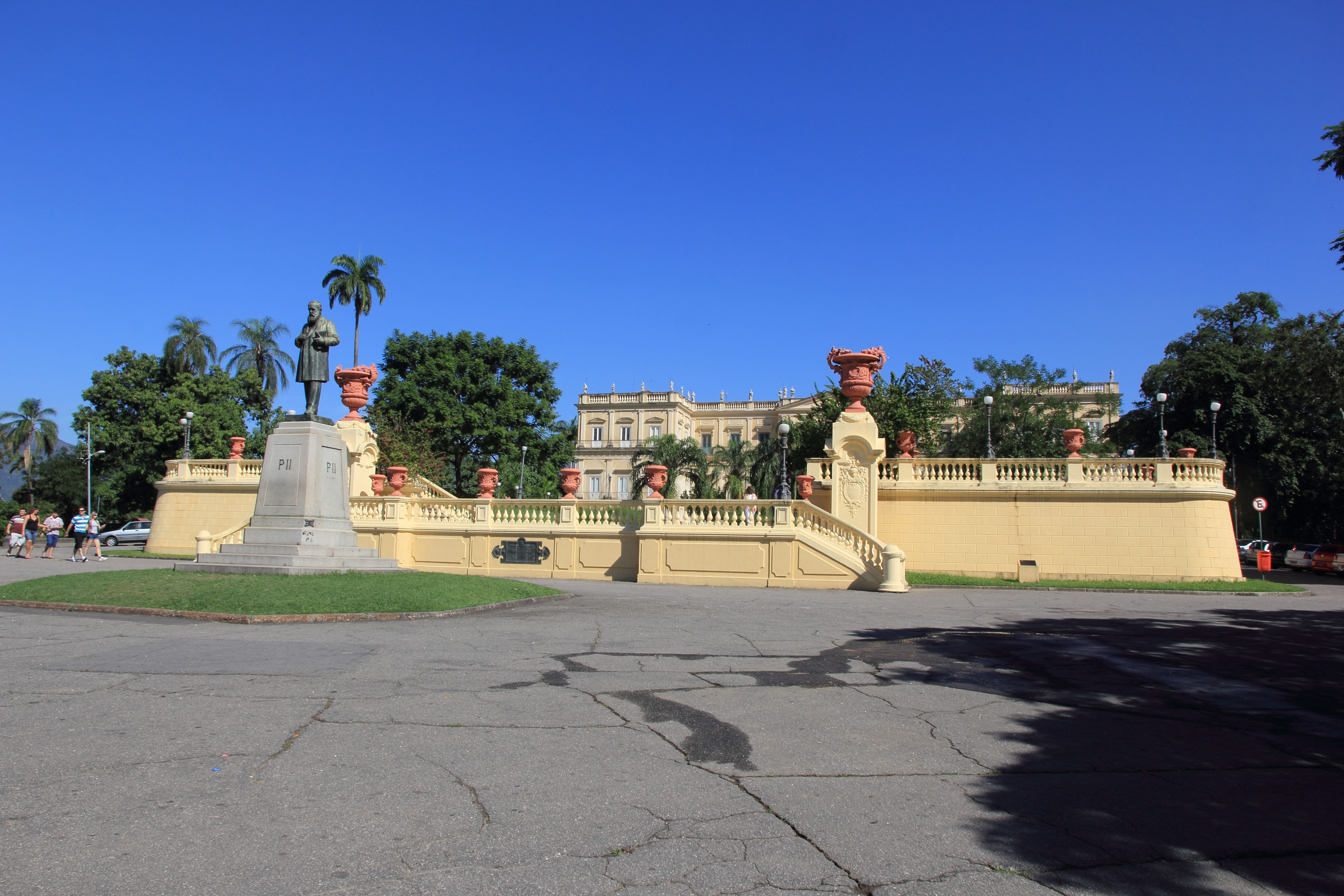
Monument to Emperor Pedro II in front of the palace

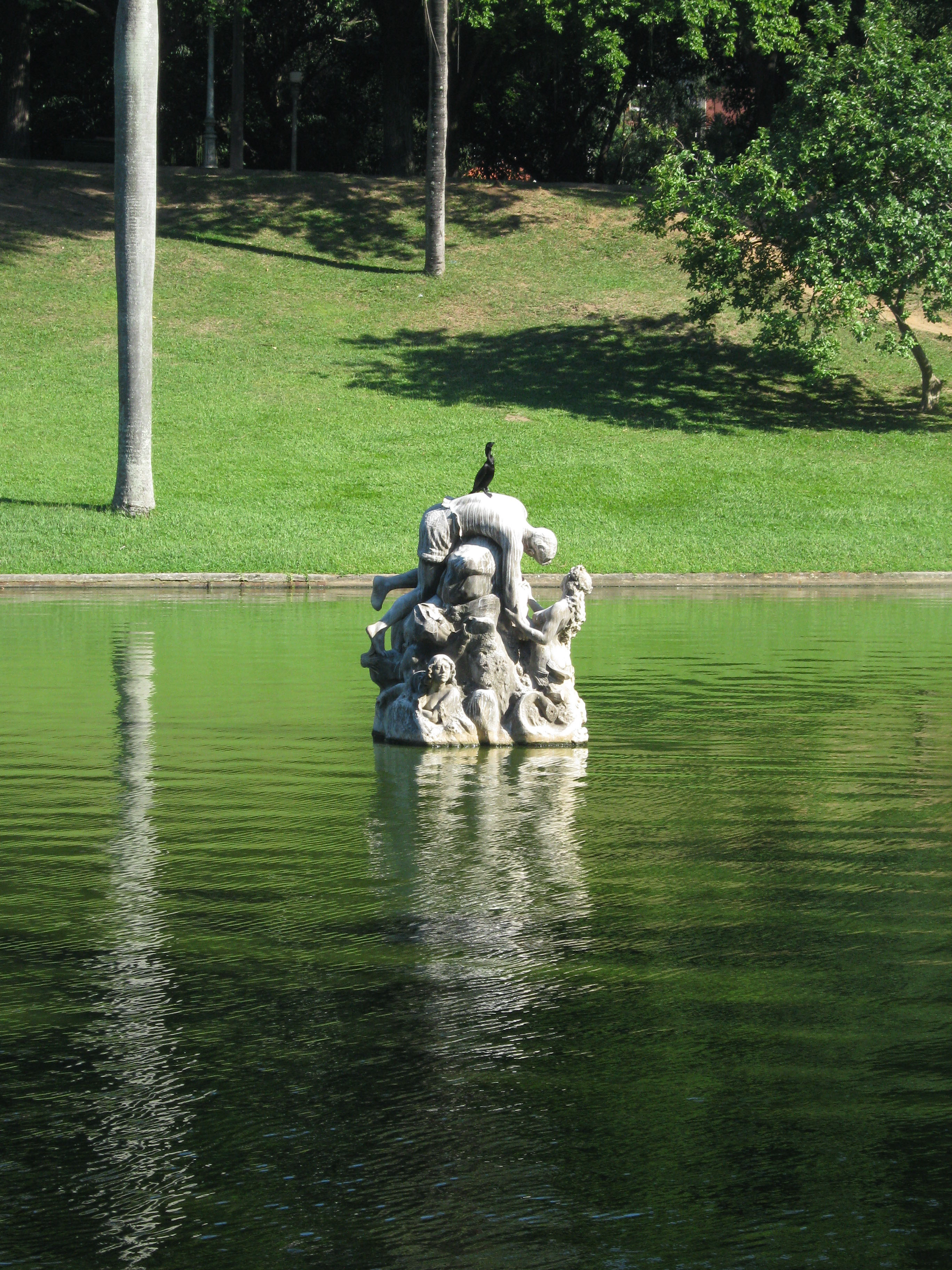
Canto das Sereias sculpture by Nicolina Vaz de Assis

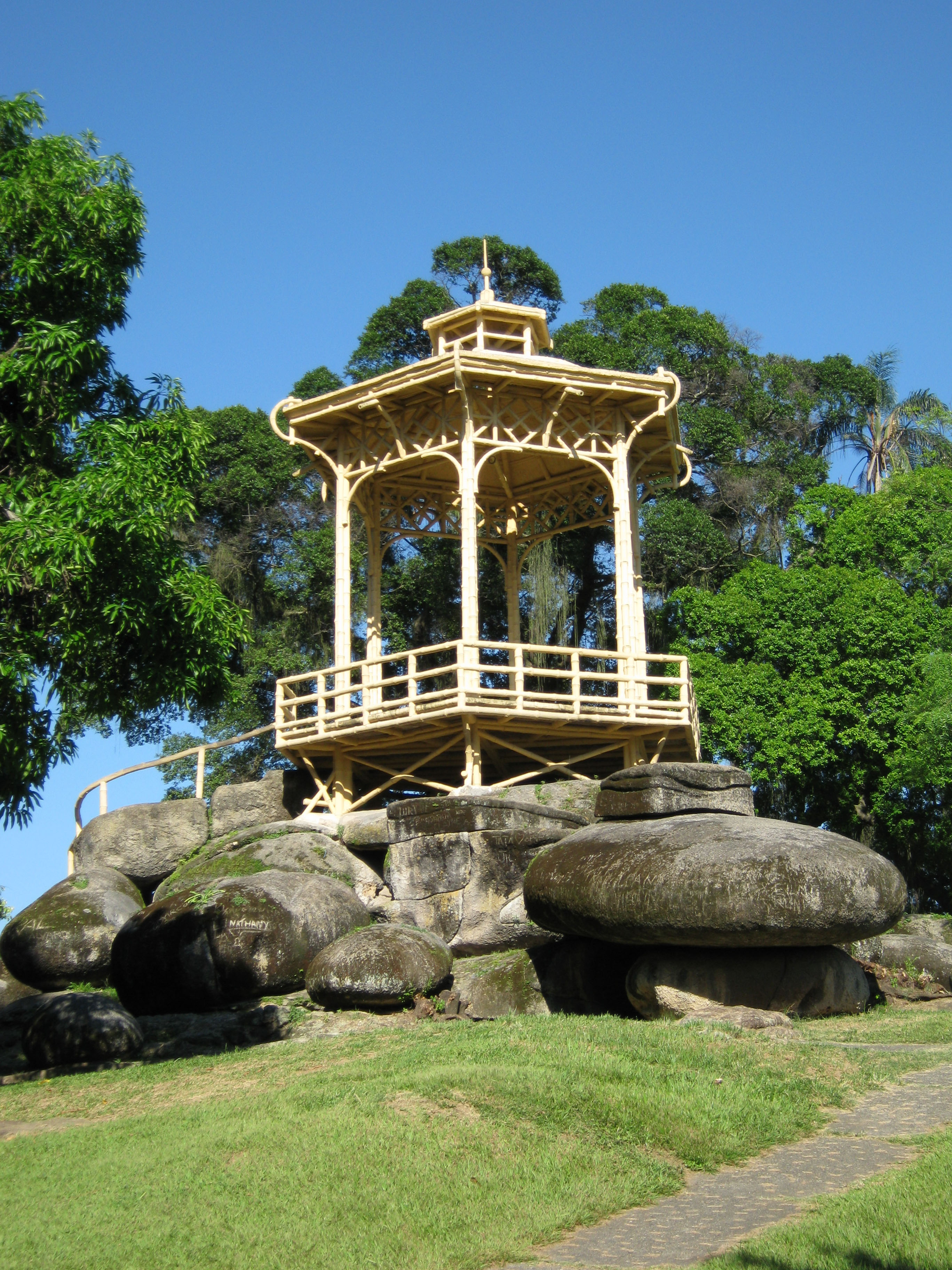
Quinta da Boa Vista's bandstand, known as the Pagode Chinês (Chinese pagoda)

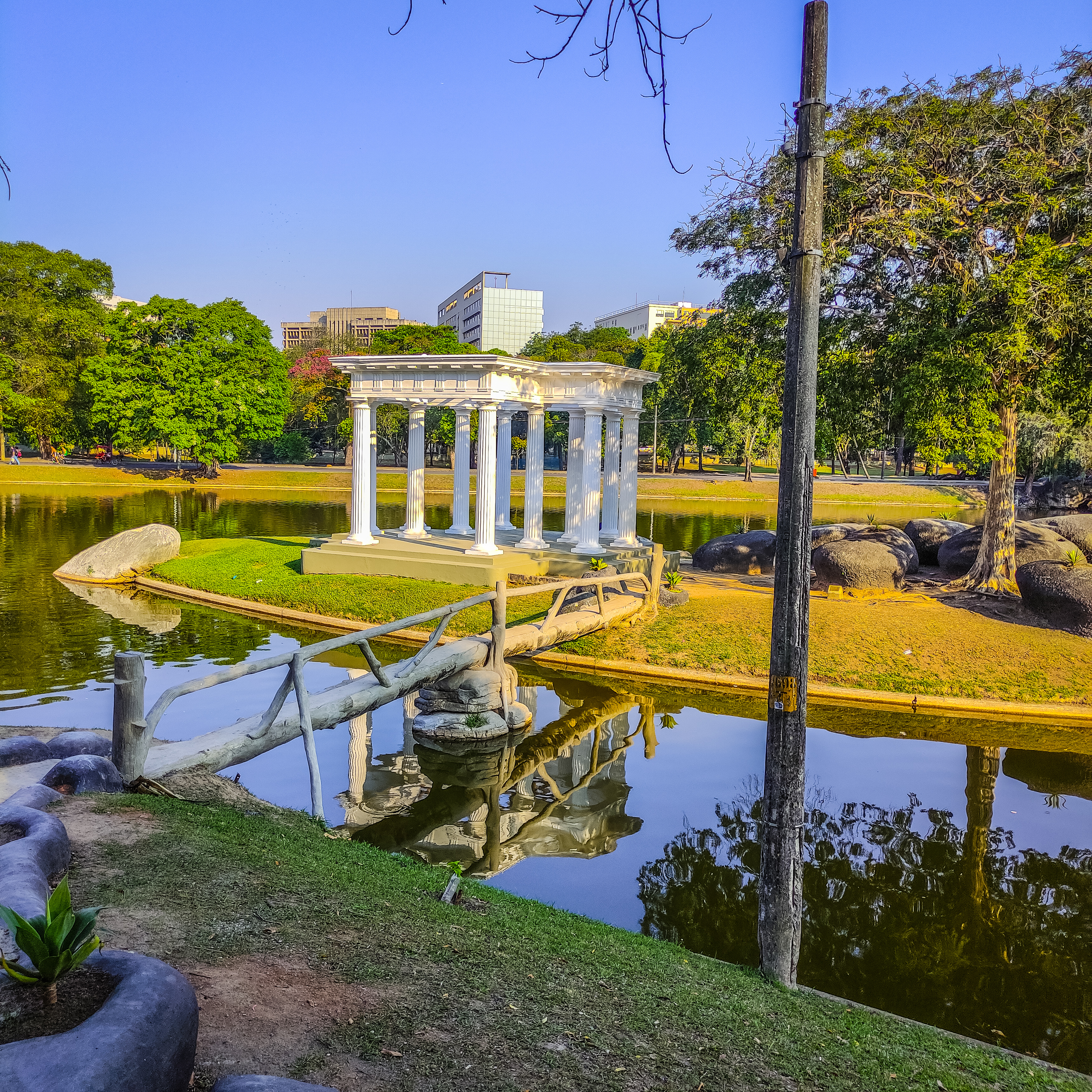
"Temple of Apollo" after restoration work in 2022

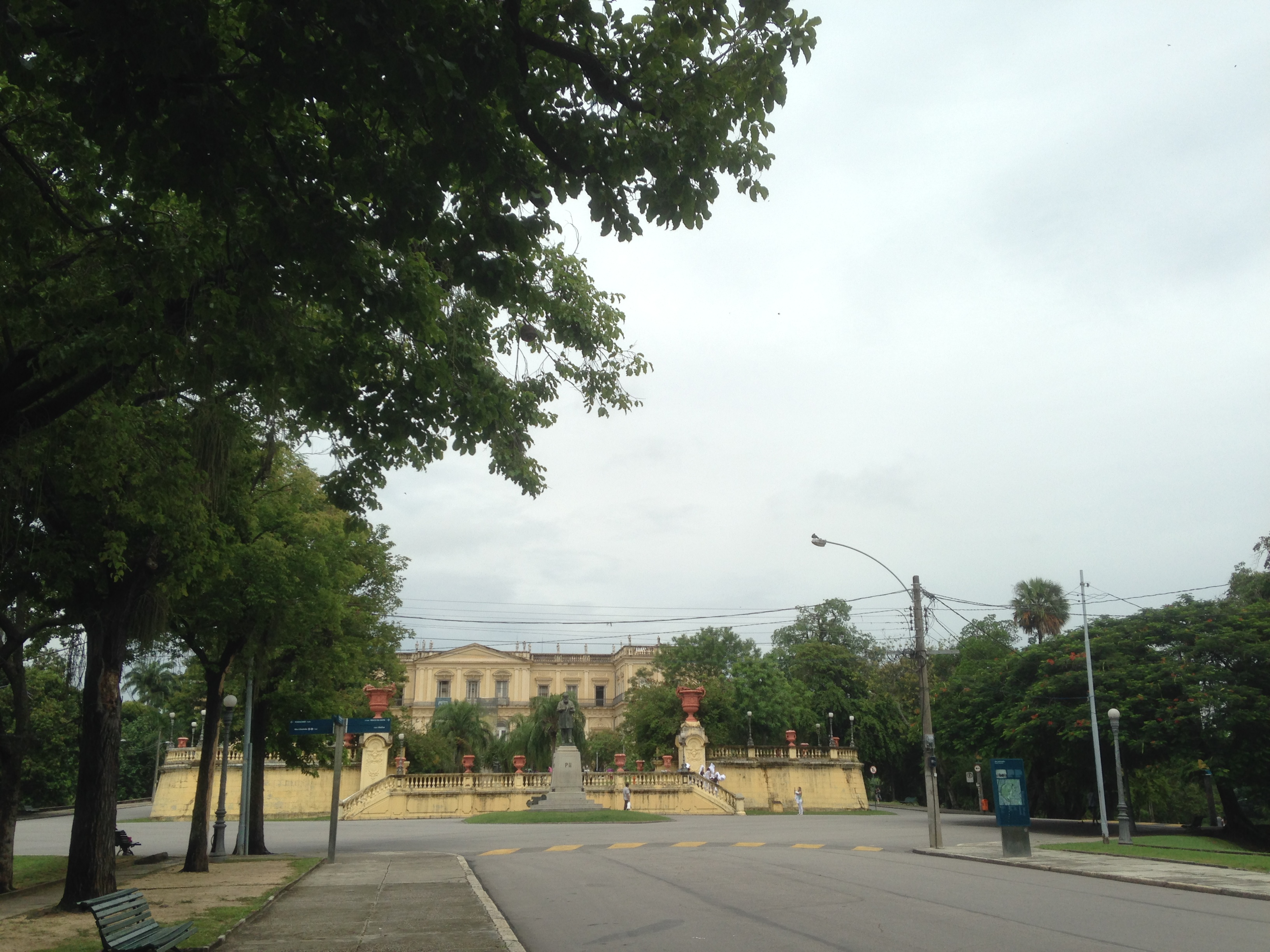
Street

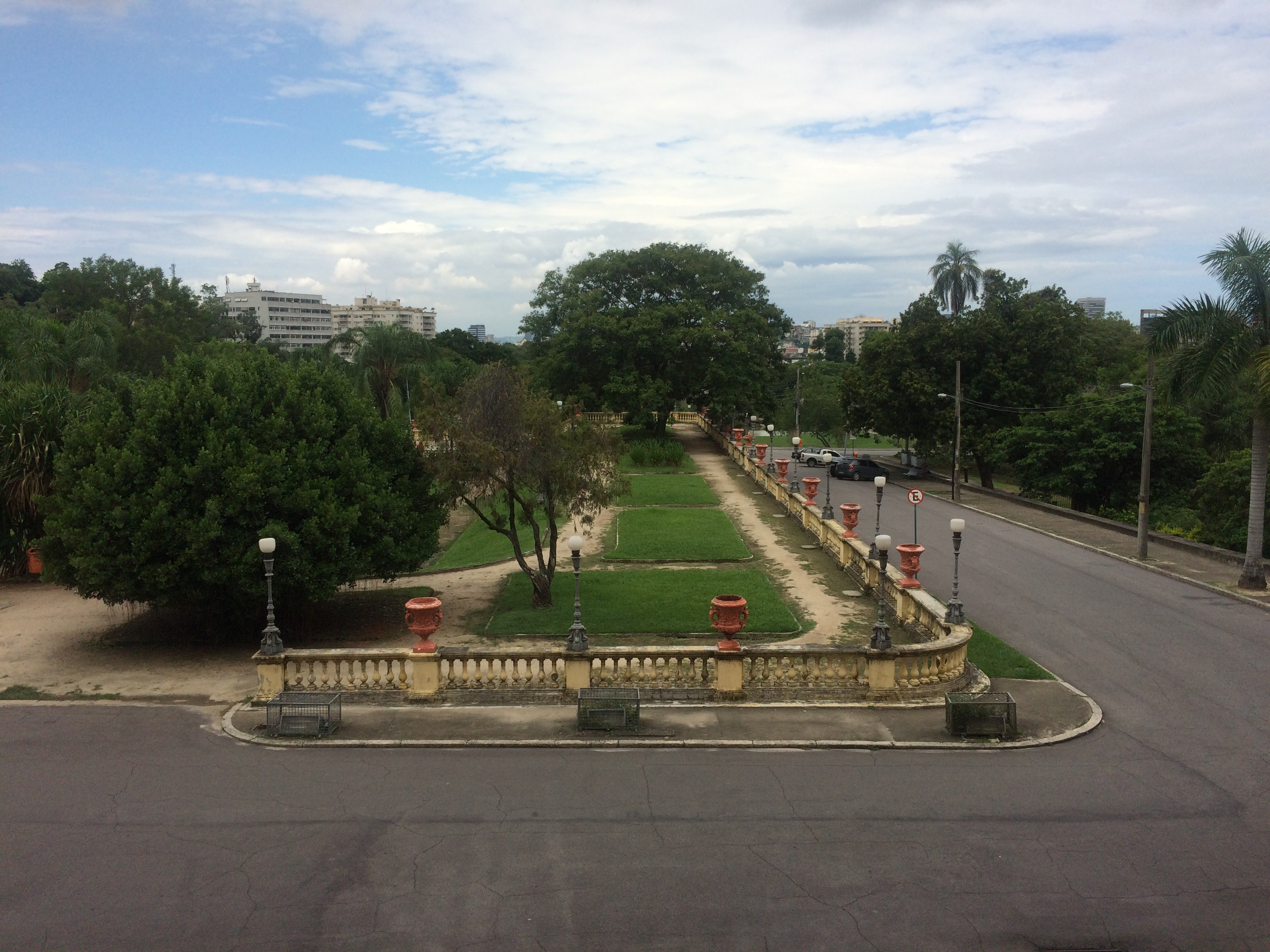
Frontal garden before restoration work

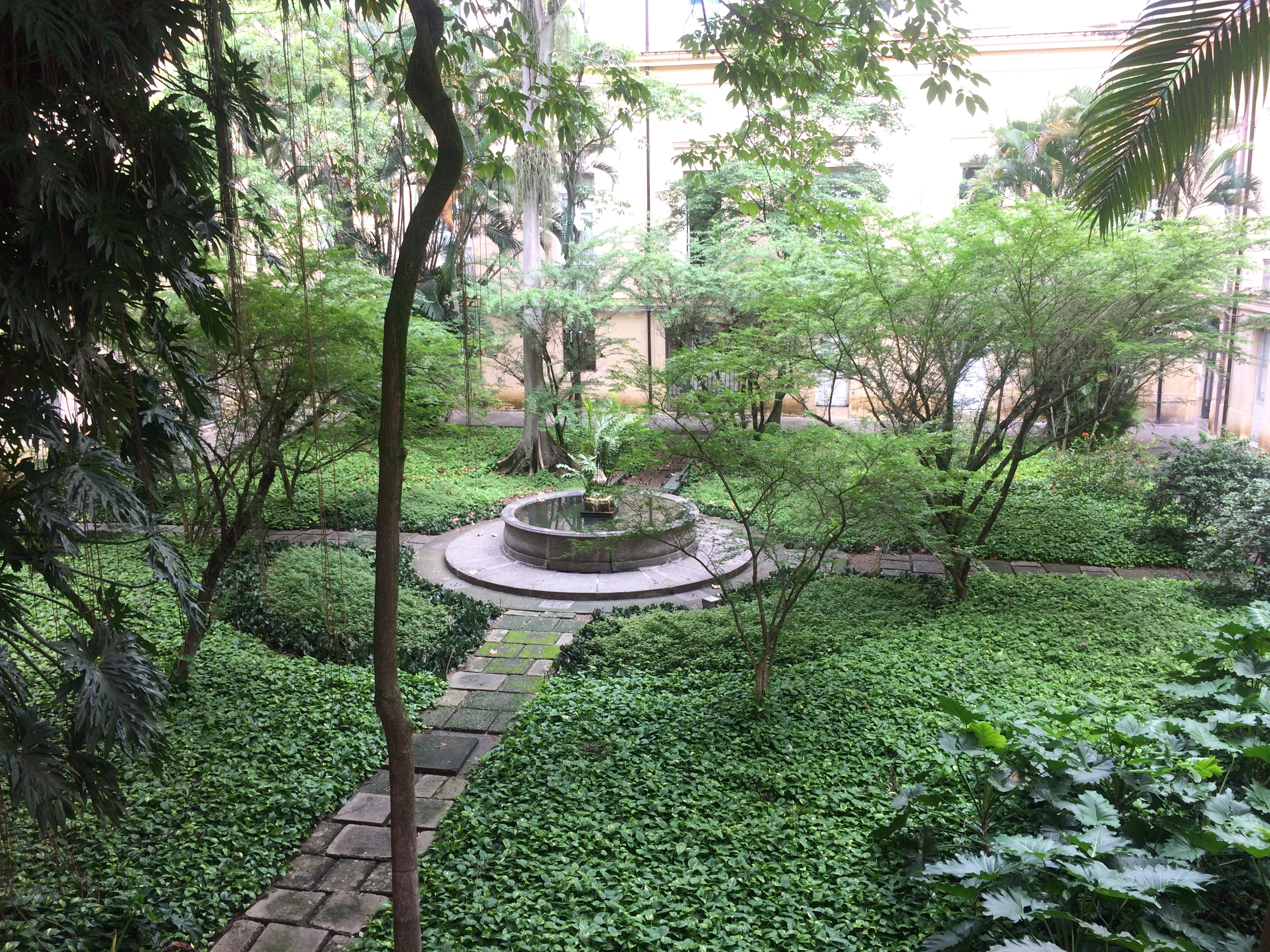
Internal garden before restoration work

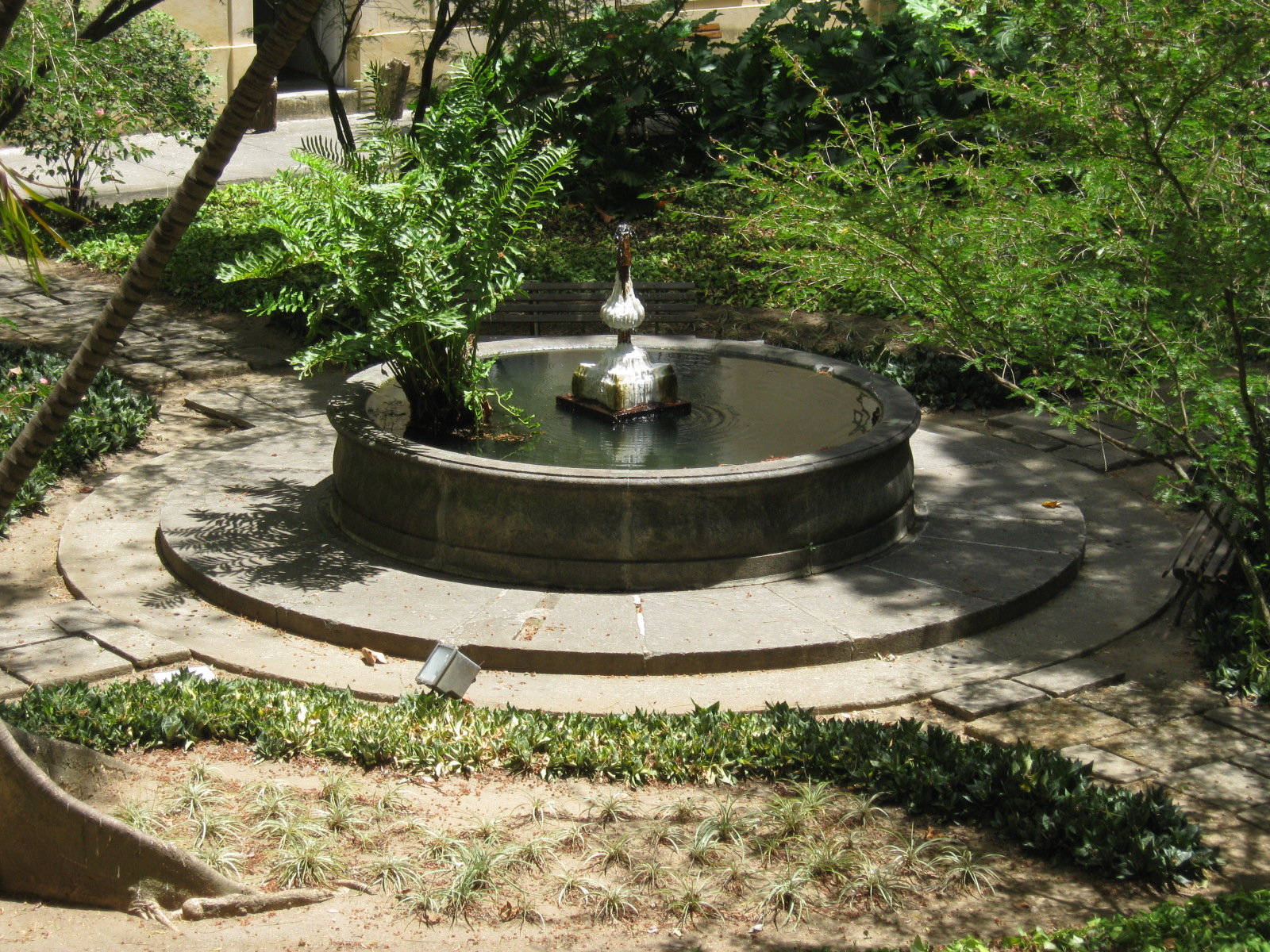
Garden fountain

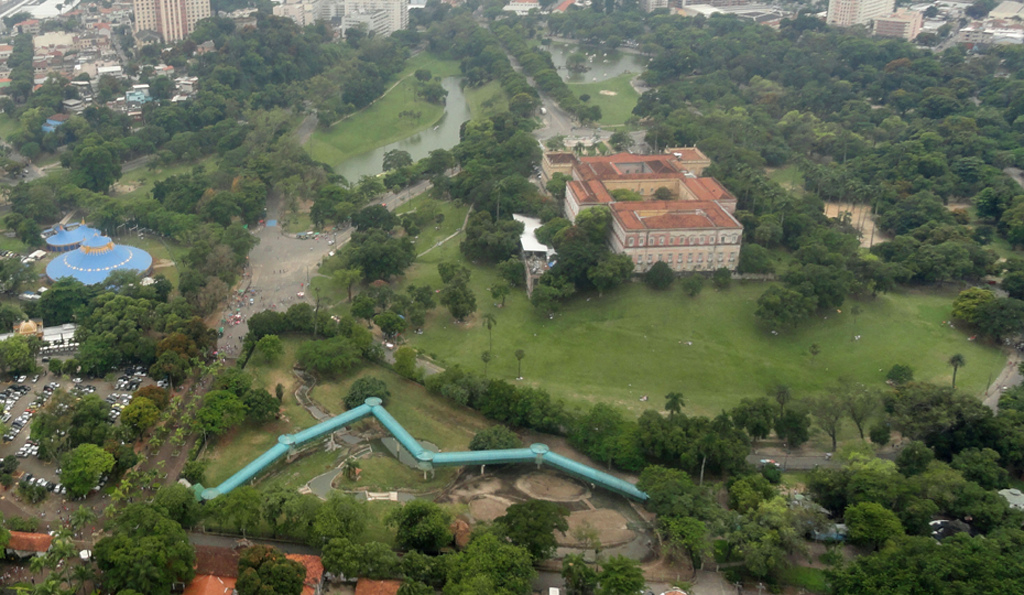
Bird's-eye view

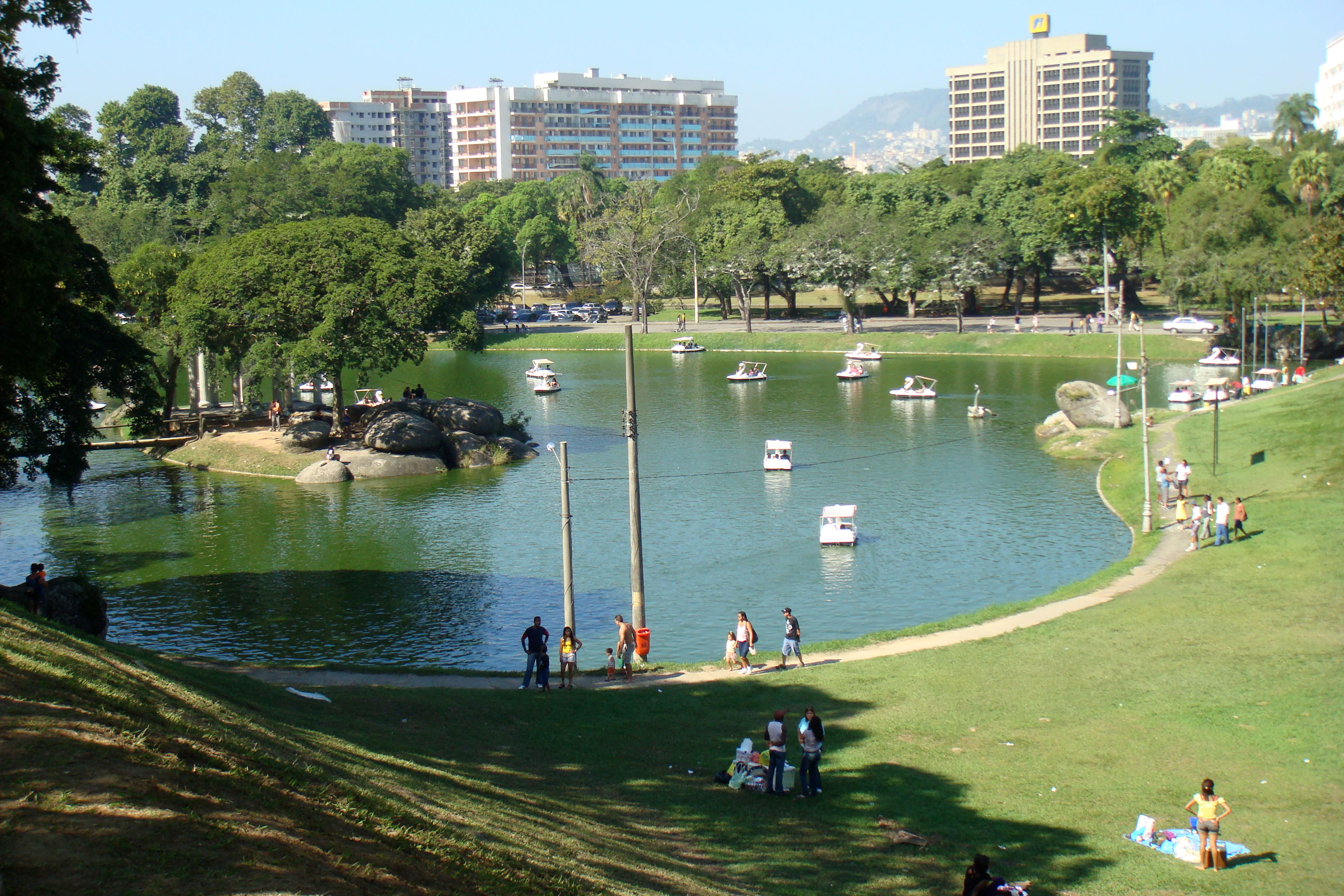
Quinta da Boa Vista park lake

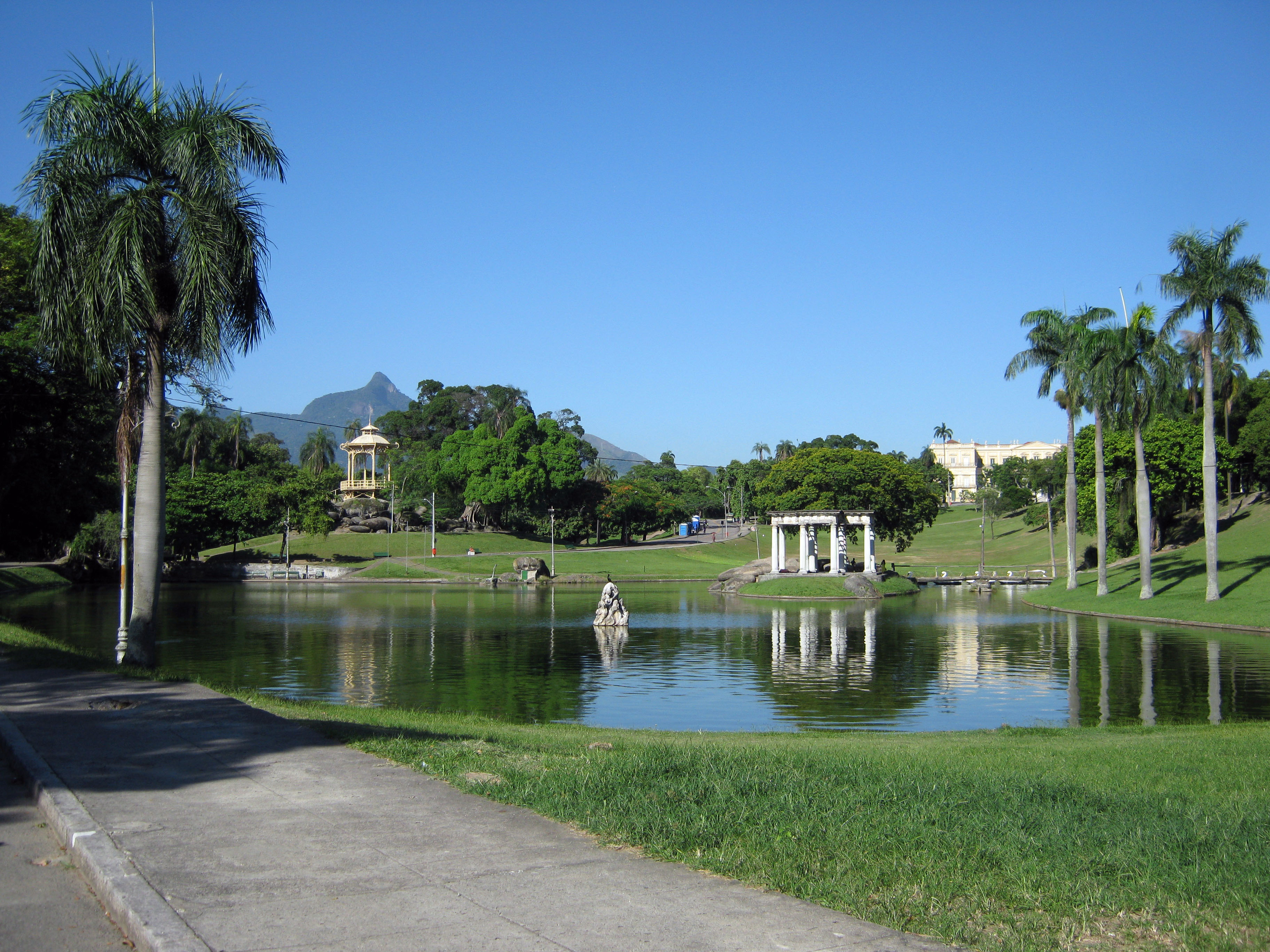
Lake with the palace in the background

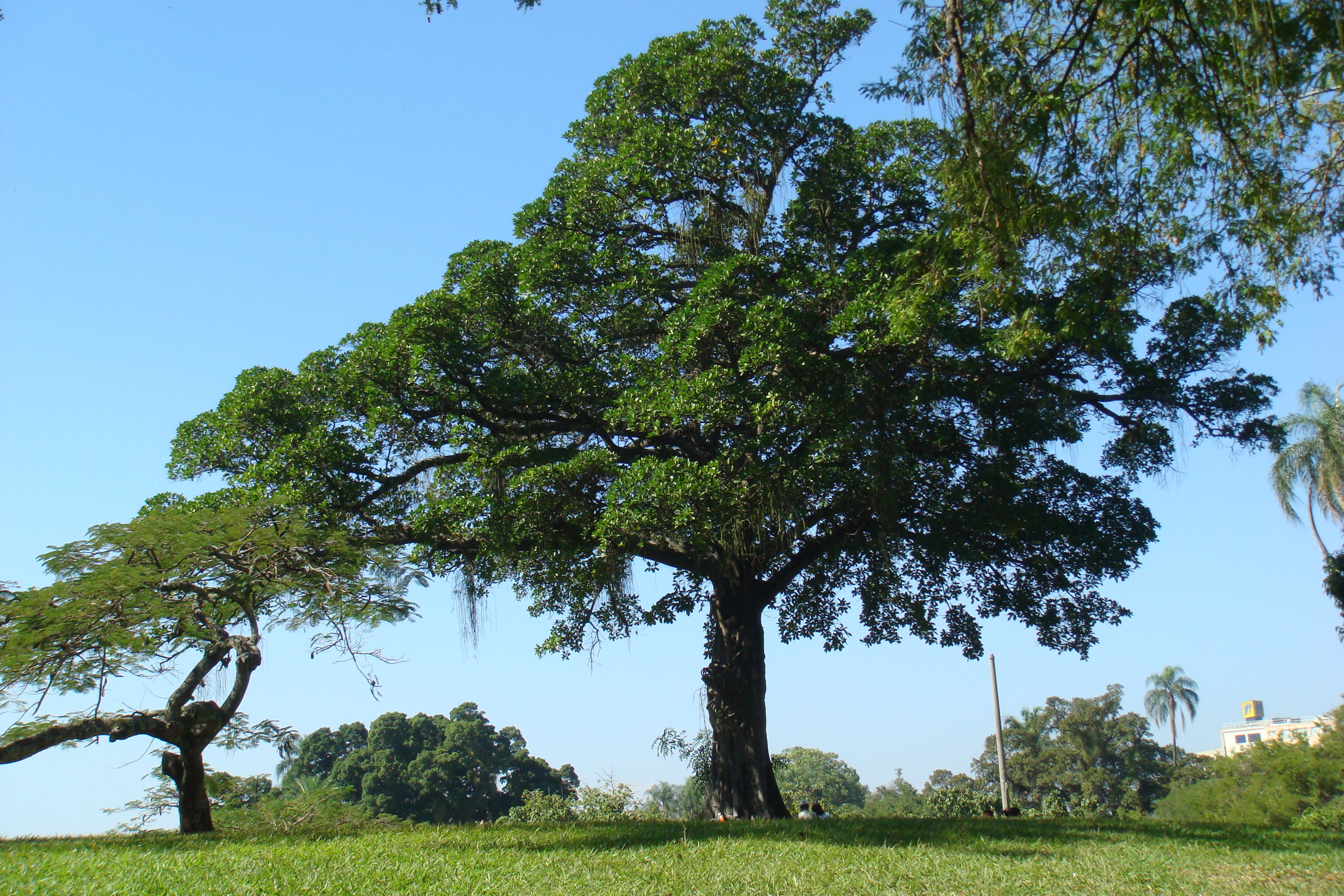
Palace grounds

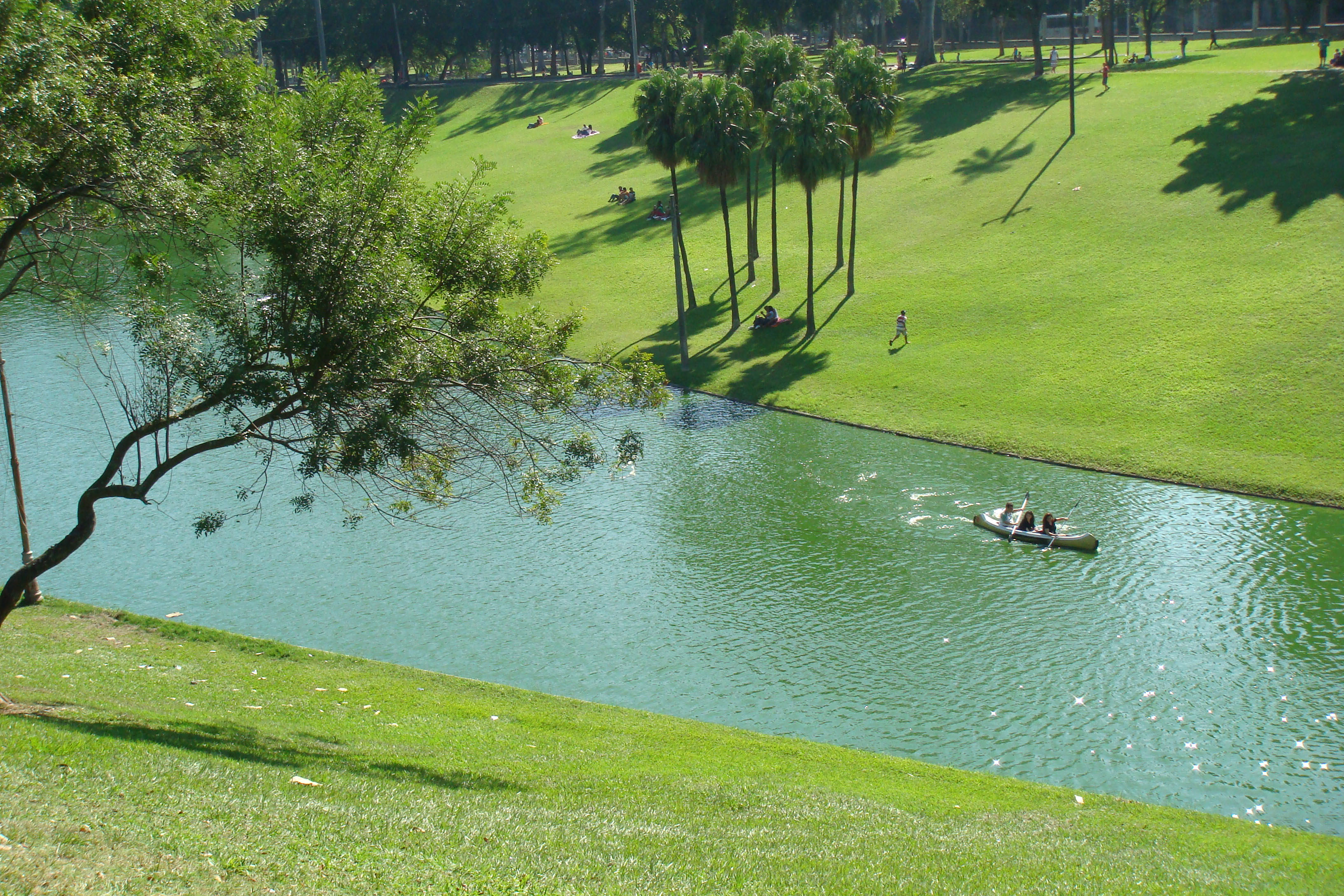
Kayaking

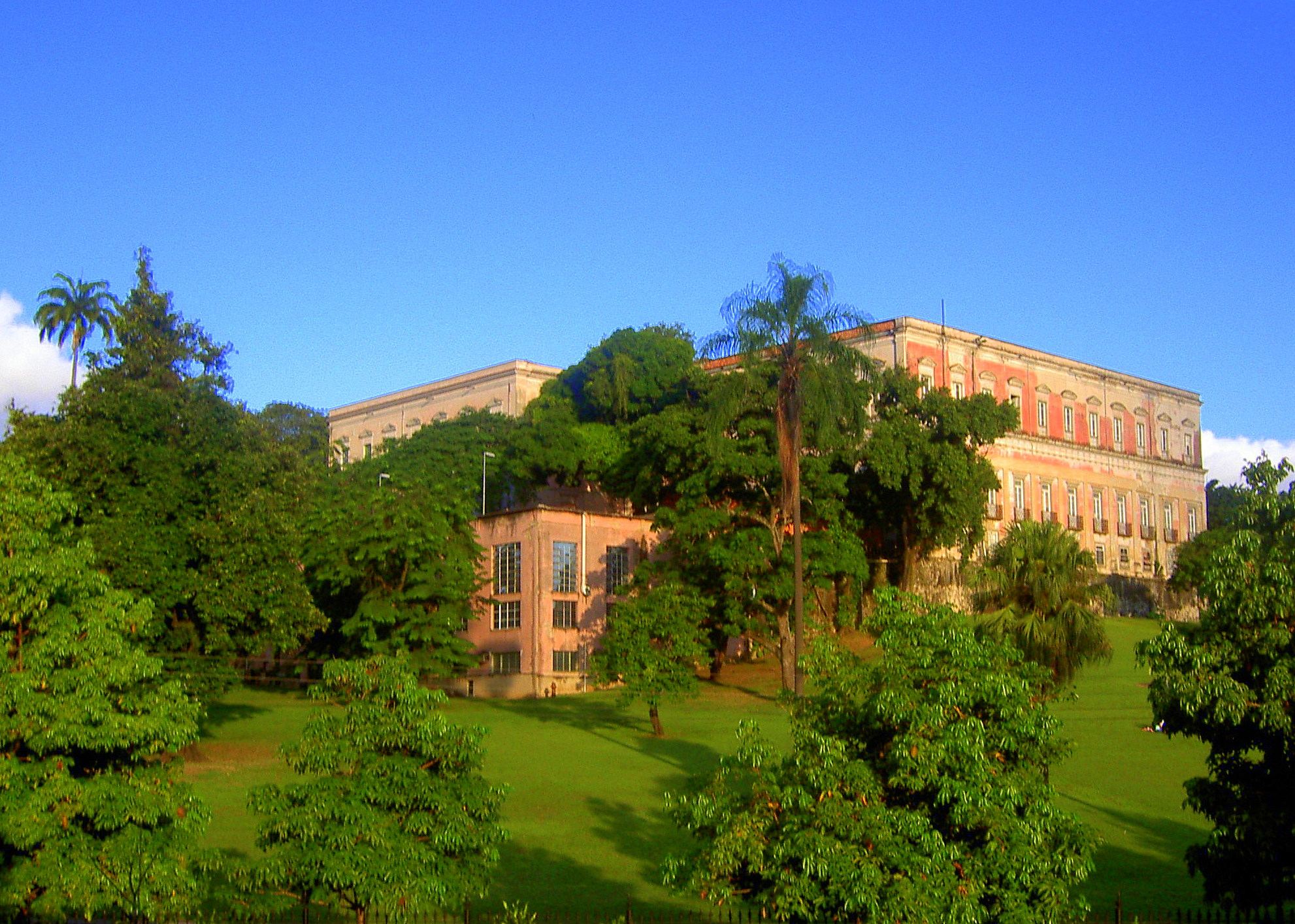
The palace rear and trees before the 2018 fire

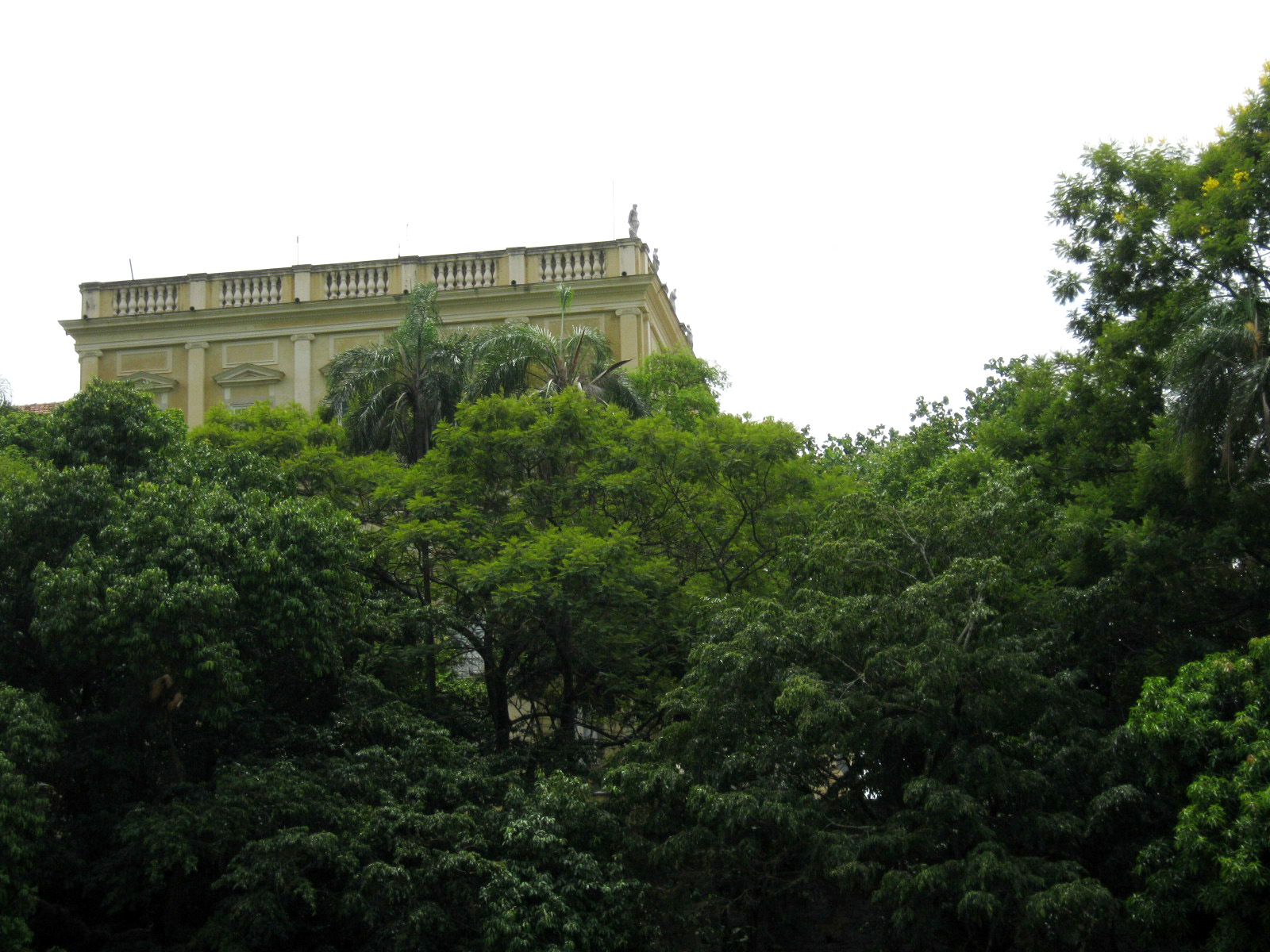
Vegetation

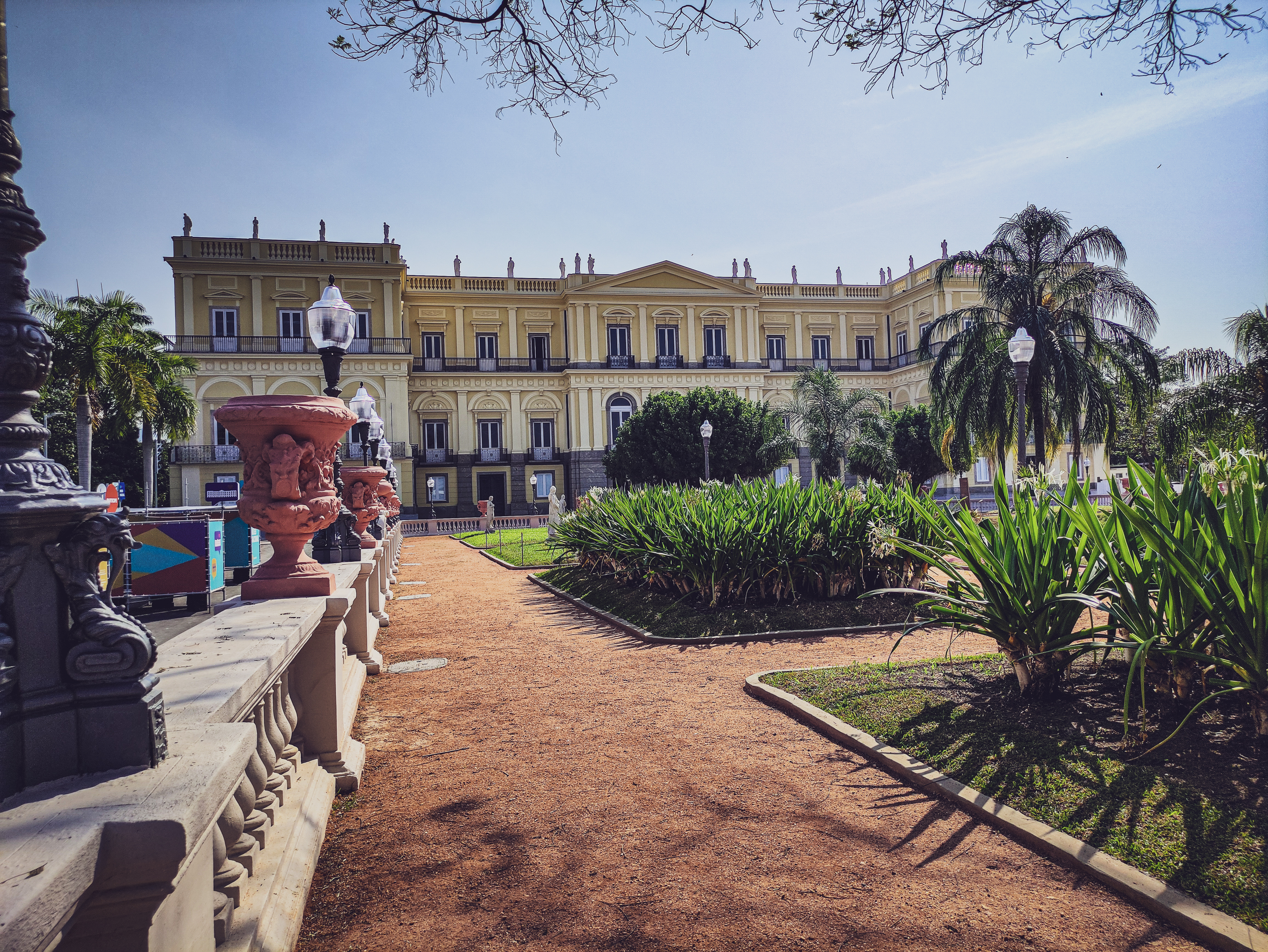
Fire-damaged facade of the palace completely restored, September 2022. View from the newly restored garden

== Investigations ==
The fire that destroyed the National Museum began in the air-conditioning equipment of auditorium on the ground floor. One of the three devices did not have external grounding, there was no individual circuit breaker for each of them and a wire was without insulation in contact with metal.

== See also ==
- Paço Imperial, the seat of the Imperial government
- Quinta da Boa Vista
- National Museum of Brazil
