= List of electrical engineers =

This is a list of electrical engineers (by no means exhaustive), people who have made notable contributions to electrical engineering or computer engineering.

Name	Contribution(s)
A	
Norman Abramson	ALOHAnet network communication
Robert Campbell Aitken	Testing and diagnosis of integrated circuits
Ernst Alexanderson	Inventing the Alexanderson alternator, amplidyne, tuned radio frequency receiver, and television advancements.
Luigi Amerio	Laplace transforms
Edwin Armstrong	Radio, Regenerative circuit, superheterodyne receiver, frequency modulation (FM)
Maria Artini	First female university graduate in electrical engineering in Italy (1918)
Rodney Adkins	First African American to serve as a senior vice president at IBM, worked on IBM ThinkPad.
Mohamed M. Atalla	Co-inventor of the MOSFET transistor
Hertha Marks Ayrton	Electric arc lighting, Hughes Medal of the Royal Society
William Edward Ayrton	Measuring instruments, electric railways, searchlight
B	
John Bardeen	Two Nobel Prizes: transistor, superconductivity
Emile Baudot	Telegraphy communications
Andy Bechtolsheim	Co-founder of Sun Microsystems
Arnold Orville Beckman	pH meter, Beckman Instruments, Silicon Valley pioneer
Alexander Graham Bell	Bell Telephone Company
Alfred Rosling Bennett	Pioneer of electric lighting and telephones
Harold Stephen Black	Negative feedback amplifier
Ottó Bláthy	Pioneering electrical engineer
André Blondel	Oscillography, electrical machine theory
Alan Blumlein	Inventions in telecommunications, sound recording, stereo, television, radar
Hendrik Wade Bode	Control theory, Bode plot
David Boggs	Co-invented Ethernet
Amar Bose	Founder of Bose Corporation
Mikhail Botvinnik	Computer chess, expert system AI
Paul Boucherot	Reactive power
Karlheinz Brandenburg	Audio compression scheme MP3
Charles Tilston Bright	Transatlantic telegraph cable
Charles Eugene Lancelot Brown	Co-founder of Brown, Boveri & Cie
William C. Brown	Crossed-field amplifier, microwave power transmission
Walter Bruch	Television pioneer, inventor of the PAL colour television system
Charles Brush	Efficient dynamo, electric lighting, a founder of General Electric, wind power
James Buie	Inventor of TTL Logic
Charles Frederick Burgess	Battery technology development, pioneer of electrochemical engineering
Vannevar Bush	First practical Differential analyser, radar advancements while head of OSRD, and co-founded Raytheon
C	
Alan Archibald Campbell-Swinton	Theory of television
Marvin Camras	Magnetic recording
John Renshaw Carson	Single-sideband modulation
Morris Chang	Founder of TSMC
Harold Chestnut	Helped establish the fields of control theory and systems engineering
John Cioffi	Digital subscriber line (DSL)
James Kilton Clapp	Clapp oscillator, General Radio Corporation
Wesley A. Clark	TX-0, TX-2, LINC one of the first minicomputers
Edith Clarke	First American female professor of EE, author of Circuit Analysis of A-C Power Systems, Alpha–beta transformation.
Lynn Conway	Very large scale integrated circuit design, Mead and Conway revolution
William Coolidge	X-ray technology
Martin Cooper	Father of the wireless cellphone
William Corin	Snowy Mountains Scheme
Ron Crane	Co-inventor of Ethernet
Seymour Cray	Supercomputer architect
Rookes Evelyn Bell Crompton	Electric lighting, FRS, Crompton & Company, Major in the U.K. Army
D	
Sidney Darlington	Darlington transistor
Lee de Forest	Audion vacuum tube
Giovanni De Micheli	Network on a chip design automation and Electronic design automation contributions
Jack Dennis	Time sharing, Multics
Robert Dennard	Dynamic random-access memory
Marcel Deprez	HVDC power transmission pioneer
Vinod Dham	Contributions to Intel's Pentium processor
Bern Dibner	Founder Burndy Co., electrical connectors, historian of the Transatlantic telegraph cable
Mikhail Dolivo-Dobrovolsky	Inventor of three-phase motor
Ray Dolby	Dolby noise-reduction system
William Duddell	Oscillography, the singing arc lamp
Allen DuMont	Television manufacturing pioneer
Russell Dupuis	pioneering contributions MOCVD, LEDs, and III-V heterojunction devices
E	
Martin Eberhard	Co-founder of Tesla
John Presper Eckert	Computer pioneer of the ENIAC and UNIVAC I
Thomas Edison	Prolific inventor: phonograph, first practical light bulb, telegraph improvements
Cyril Frank Elwell	Continuous Wave radio transmission, AM radio, founder of Federal Telegraph Company
Douglas Engelbart	Computer mouse, hypertext
Gertrude Lilian Entwisle	First woman student member of Institution of Electrical Engineers first female engineer at British Westinghouse.
Justus Entz	Electric transmission, electric vehicles, worked with Edison
Agner Krarup Erlang	Communications and Queueing
Lloyd Espenschied	Developments in radio communications and coaxial cable technology.
F	
Federico Faggin	Intel microprocessor, Zilog z80
Michael Faraday	Discovered electromagnetic induction and Faraday shield
Moses Farmer	Electric railway
Philo Farnsworth	American television pioneer
Galileo Ferraris	Rotating magnetic field
Sebastian Ziani de Ferranti	Ferranti Corporation
Reginald Fessenden	'Father' of radio broadcasting
Donald Fink	Radio navigation LORAN, television standards, author and editor
Hal Finney	Helped Satoshi Nakamoto create Bitcoin
Gerhard Fischer	Handheld metal detector
John Ambrose Fleming	Inventor of the thermionic valve (vacuum tube)
Tommy Flowers	Designer of the first programmable digital electronic compute, the Colossus computer
Jay Forrester	American computer pioneer
Charles Legeyt Fortescue	Symmetrical components for three-phase power system analysis
Jean Baptiste Joseph Fourier	Physicist; Fourier transform / Fourier series
Limor Fried	Founder of Adafruit Industries, open source hardware advocate
Leonard Fuller	Radio pioneer, carrier current on power systems
G	
Dennis Gabor	Hungarian inventor of holography, Nobel Prize in Physics
Jack Gifford	Co-founded Maxim Integrated Products and Advanced Micro Devices
Claire Gmachl	Advanced development of quantum cascade lasers
Bernhard Goldenberg	Responsible for the rapid expansion of electrification in the Rhineland and Ruhr area
Maxwell K. Goldstein	Helped develop and deploy High-frequency direction finding during World War II
James Edward Henry Gordon (J.E.H. Gordon)	Electric lighting and power
Zénobe Gramme	Dynamo
Elisha Gray	Telephone pioneer
Cecil Howard Green	Co-founder of Texas Instruments
Richard Grimsdale	Transistorized computers
Victor Grinich	Co-founded Fairchild Semiconductor
H	
Susan Hackwood	Co-inventor of electro-wetting
Patrick E. Haggerty	Co-founder of Texas Instruments
Erna Hamburger	Swiss electrical engineer working in radio-wave research. First female STEM professor in Switzerland.
Edward E. Hammer	Spiral compact fluorescent lamp
Naomi Halas	Nanophotonics
Roger F. Harrington	Computational electromagnetics, method of moments (MoM)
Ralph Hartley	Electronics
Caroline Haslett	Founder of The Woman Engineer
Oliver Heaviside	Re-formulated Maxwell's equations (vector calculus)
Oskar Heil	Field-effect transistor, loudspeaker
Heinrich Rudolf Hertz	Hertzian waves
Peter Cooper Hewitt	Mercury vapor lamp, mercury arc rectifier
William Hewlett	Hewlett-Packard
Hugo Hirst	Co-founder of General Electric Company
Marcian Hoff	Co-developed the microprocessor, ADALINE neural network, least mean squares filter
Godfrey Hounsfield	Inventor of the world's first computed tomography (CT) scanner, shared 1979 Nobel Prize
Edwin J. Houston	Arc lighting, co-founder of what would become General Electric, president of AIEE
John Hopkinson	Inventor of three-phase electrical system
Grace Hopper	Computer programmer (first compiler)
Jensen Huang	Founder of Nvidia
Lawrence A. Hyland	Radar pioneer, leader of Hughes Aircraft
Paul Horowitz	SETI, co-author of The Art of Electronics
Mina Hsiang	Third Administrator of the United States Digital Service, Executive Office of the President of the United States
I	
Masaru Ibuka	Co-founder of Sony
Kees Schouhamer Immink	Pioneer optical recording, CD, DVD, Blu-ray Disc
Samuel Insull	Central station generation, electrical utilities, Edison pioneer
J	
Irwin M. Jacobs	Co-founder of Qualcomm
Fleeming Jenkin	Submarine telegraph cables
Kristina Johnson	Polarization-control techniques
Bill Joy	Unix - Sun Microsystems
K	
Robert Kahn	Transmission Control Protocol (TCP) and the Internet Protocol (IP) with Vint Cerf
Dawon Kahng	Co-inventor of the MOSFET transistor
Rudolf Kálmán	Inventor of the Kalman filter
Kálmán Kandó	Pioneer of high voltage railway electrification systems
Nathaniel S. Keith	Founding secretary of AIEE; electric power
Arthur E. Kennelly	Complex numbers in AC circuit theory
Charles Kettering	Automobile electrical innovations, Delco founder
Jack Kilby	Nobel Prize: integrated circuit
Max Knoll	Electron microscope
Otto A. Knopp	Innovator of the standard testing transformer and the compensation winding.
Alan Kotok	PDP-10
John D. Kraus	Radio telescope, antennas
Herbert Kroemer	Heterostructures and semiconductor physics
Gabriel Kron	Diakoptics
L	
Eric Laithwaite	Linear induction motor
Uno Lamm	Swedish, HVDC and mercury-arc valves
Ayyalasomayajula Lalitha	India’s first female electrical engineer
Benjamin G. Lamme	Niagara Falls power engineering
Bertha Lamme	Westinghouse's first female engineer, first American woman to graduate in a main discipline of engineering other than civil engineering
Georges Leclanché	Primary battery
Morris E. Leeds	Leeds & Northrup measurement and control devices
Burn-Jeng Lin	Pioneered immersion lithography at TSMC
Alexander Lodygin	Russian, incandescent lighting, motors
M	
Chris Malachowsky	Co-founder of Nvidia and worked on Sun Microsystems GX graphics architecture
Östen Mäkitalo	'Father' of cellular phone
Guglielmo Marconi	Practical radio
Orlando R. Marsh	Electrical sound recording
Erwin Otto Marx	Marx generator high voltage DC
Mabel Lucy Matthews	British electrical and production engineer, instigator of idea for the Electrical Association for Women
John Mauchly	ENIAC and UNIVAC I designer
Florence Violet McKenzie	Australia's first female EE, educator, OBE
Sanjay Mehrotra	Co-founder of Sandisk and CEO of Micron
Charles Hesterman Merz	NESCO electric power grid, England
William Henry Merrill	Founder of Underwriters Laboratories
Robert Metcalfe	Ethernet, 3Com
Antonio Meucci	Telephone pioneer
John L. Moll	Solid-state physics, the Ebers-Moll transistor model
Robert Moog	Electronic music pioneer, invented Moog synthesizer
Daniel McFarlan Moore	Electrical discharge lighting
Samuel Morse	Electrical telegraph and Morse code
N	
Satya Nadella	Microsoft CEO
Shuji Nakamura	Blue gallium-nitride light-emitting diode
Thyagarajan Nandagopal	Wireless network optimization, RFID systems, and network architectures
Arun Netravali	HDTV, digital compression, signal processing.
Edward Lawry Norton	Norton's theorem
Robert Noyce	Co-founder of Fairchild Semiconductor and Intel
O	
Bernard M. (Barney) Oliver	Hewlett-Packard, founder HP Labs
Kenneth Olsen	Magnetic-core memory; Digital Equipment Corporation
Stanford R. Ovshinsky	Semiconductors
P	
David Packard	Hewlett-Packard
Konstantinos Papathanassiou	Polarimetric interferometry for synthetic aperture radar
Robert H. Park	Park's transformation
Margaret Partridge	Electrical engineer, contractor and founder member of the Women's Engineering Society (WES) and the Electrical Association for Women (EAW). Helped change the International Labour Organisation convention on night work for women in 1934
David Patterson	Berkeley RISC, DLX, RISC-V, reduced instruction set computer
R. Fabian Pease	Professor at Stanford University
Donald Pederson	'Father' of SPICE
Serge Pelissou	Characterize extruded cables and components in their life cycles
Dinh Thuy Phan Huy	Wireless 5G research in Europe
G. W. Pierce	Oscillator, crystal control
William Henry Preece	Telegraphy, nemesis of Heaviside
Curtis Priem	Co-founder of Nvidia, Sun Microsystems GX architecture, IBM Professional Graphics Adapter
Franklin Leonard Pope	Telegraphy, electric lighting, Edison influence
Valdemar Poulsen	Magnetic recording
Michael I. Pupin	Long-distance telephone communication; "Pupin coil"
R	
Simon Ramo	Physicist, microwaves, missiles, founder of TRW and Bunker Ramo Corporation
Elliot Rappaport	Grounding in industrial and commercial power systems
Richard H. Ranger	Wireless fax, radar, magnetic tape recording
Alec Reeves	Inventor of pulse code modulation
Johann Philipp Reis	Inventor of the Reis telephone
Rao Remala	One of the lead developers of the first version of Microsoft Windows
Stephen Renals	Speech recognition technology
Chester Williams Rice	Moving coil loudspeaker
Hyman G. Rickover	'Father' of the nuclear Navy
Mabel MacFerran Rockwell	Only woman to work on the electrical systems of Hoover Dam' pioneer in aeronautical electronics
T. J. Rodgers	Founder of Cypress Semiconductor
Edward S. Rogers, Sr.	Inventor of the first successful AC radio tube
Francis Ronalds	Built first working electric telegraph
Arye Rosen	Semiconductor devices and circuits for use in microwave systems and for microwave applications to medicine
Harold Rosen	Syncom communication satellite
H. J. Round	Radio pioneer and assistant to Guglielmo Marconi
Reinhold Rudenberg	Electron microscope
S	
Henry Samueli	Co-founder of Broadcom
Jerry Sanders	Co-founder of Advanced Micro Devices (AMD)
Philip Schniter	Signal processing in communications
Carl Louis Schwendler	Electric lighting and telegraph
Thomas Johann Seebeck	Thermoelectric effect
Oliver B. Shallenberger	AC electricity meters
Claude Shannon	'Father' of information theory
Ernst Werner von Siemens	Inventor, industrialist, Siemens & Halske, Siemens (unit)
Carl Wilhelm Siemens	Telegraphy, motors and generators, electric pyrometer
Alexander Siemens	Electric lighting, power, Society of Telegraph Engineers (predecessor to IEE)
Phillip Hagar Smith	Smith chart
Haruhisa Soda	Vertical-cavity surface-emitting and distributed-feedback lasers
Mehmet Soyuer	Design of high-frequency integrated circuits
Percy Spencer	Microwave oven
Frank J. Sprague	'Father' of electric traction
Chauncey Starr	Founder of Electric Power Research Institute
J. J. Stiffler	Key contributions in communications (especially coding theory) and fault-tolerant computing
Charles Proteus Steinmetz	Alternating current theories, first use of j operator
Lisa Su	CEO of Advanced Micro Devices
Senichi Suzuki	High-density integrated silica-based planar lightwave circuits
T	
Sarkes Tarzian	Radio inventor, broadcasting, radio manufacturer
Albert H. Taylor	First demonstration of radar
Bernard D. H. Tellegen	Inventor of the pentode, formulated Tellegen's theorem
Nikola Tesla	Revolving magnetic field induction motor, Tesla coil, polyphase transmission systems, transformer.
Charles P. Thacker	Xerox Alto, mouse, and GUI.
Silvanus P. Thompson	Educator, author, electrical machinery, X-ray technology, radio
Elihu Thomson	Entrepreneur, co-founder of what would become General Electric
William Thomson (Lord Kelvin)	Telegraphic cables
René Thury	High-voltage direct current power transmission, electric traction
Kálmán Tihanyi	Television pioneer
Philip Torchio	Edison Electric Company
U	
Ralph Ungermann	Co-founded Zilog and Ungermann-Bass
V	
Charles Joseph Van Depoele	Electric railway pioneer
C. F. Varley	Submarine cable, Varley bridge
Milan Vidmar	Power transformers and high-voltage transmission
Mahesh Viswanathan	Cloud computing and vehicular speech communications
Andrew Viterbi	Co-founder of Qualcomm and invented the Viterbi algorithm
Alessandro Volta	Inventor of electrical battery and pioneer of electrical science
Bernard V. Vonderschmitt	Co-founded Xilinx and pioneered fabless semiconductor manufacturing
W	
Trevor Wadley	Innovations in radio and microwave technology
Pengjun Wan	Scheduling and resource allocation in wireless networks
Harry Ward Leonard	Inventor of the Ward Leonard control system
Robert Watson-Watt	First practical radar
C. C. Wei	President, chairman, and CEO of TSMC
Chen Wen-tsuen	Taiwan Academic Network (TANet)
George Westinghouse	AC power industrialist
Harold Alden Wheeler	Automatic volume control, radar
Uncas A. Whitaker	Founder of AMP Inc. and philanthropist
Bob Widlar	Linear integrated circuits, Widlar current source, and operational amplifier
Niklaus Wirth	Computer programming languages
Feng Wu	Visual data compression and communication
Steve Wozniak	Personal computers, Apple Computer
Y	
Pavel Yablochkov	Electric arc lighting
Hidetsugu Yagi	Yagi-Uda antenna
Kane S. Yee	Finite-difference time-domain method
Z	
Otto Julius Zobel	Filters
Konrad Zuse	Computers

== See also ==
- List of IEEE publications
- List of engineering schools
- List of engineers - for lists of engineers from other disciplines
- List of free electronics circuit simulators
- List of Russian electrical engineers
