= Nandagopal (name) =

Nandagopal is name. People with the name include:

- S. Nandagopal
- Nandagopal
- Nandagopal Kidambi
- Thyagarajan Nandagopal
