= Haruhisa =

- Gender: Male

Origin
- Origin: Japanese
- Meaning: Different meanings depending on the kanji used

Haruhisa (written: 晴久 or 治久) is a masculine Japanese given name. Notable people with the name include:

- Amago Haruhisa (尼子 晴久) (1514–1561), Japanese daimyō
- Haruhisa Handa (半田 晴久) (born 1951), Japanese religious leader and businessman
- Haruhisa Hasegawa (長谷川 治久) (born 1957), Japanese footballer
- Haruhisa Soda, Japanese engineer
- See also:
