= List of Russian electrical engineers =

This list of Russian electrical engineers includes the electrical engineers, inventors and physicist from the Russian Empire, the Soviet Union and the Russian Federation.

See also the Category:Russian electrical engineers.

== Alphabetical list ==
=== A ===
- Zhores Alferov, physicist, inventor of heterotransistor, Nobel Prize winner

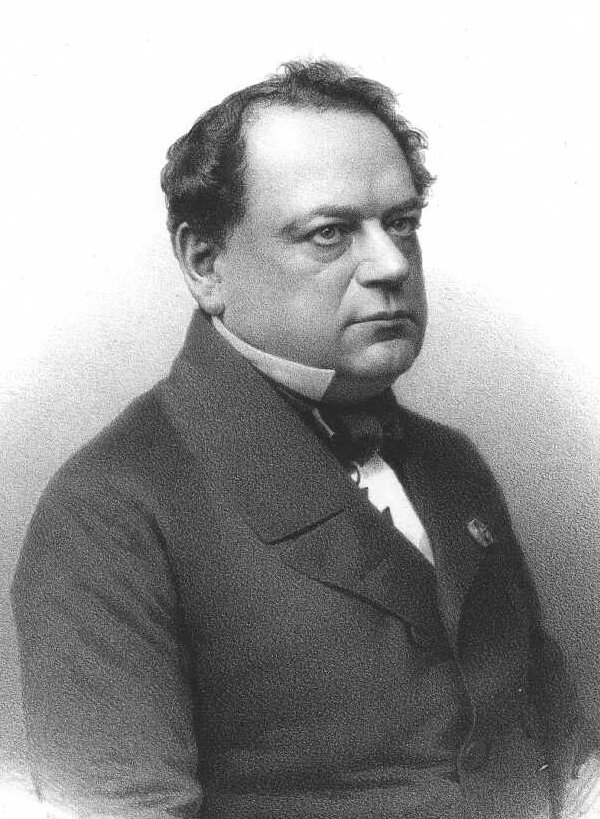
Jacobi

=== B ===
- Pyotr Bagration, inventor of dry galvanic cell and gold electroplating
- Lev Belkind, engineer and historian of science, author of the several biographies of famous Russian and foreign electrical engineers
- Nikolay Benardos, inventor of carbon arc welding (the first practical arc welding method)
- Mikhail Bonch-Bruevich, co-inventor of flip-flop and reflex klystron, major developer of radiolocation
- Mikhail Botvinnik, three times World Chess Champion, earned his doctorate in electrical engineering

=== D ===
- Mikhail Dolivo-Dobrovolsky, inventor of three-phase electric power

=== G ===
- Boris Galitzine, inventor of electric seismograph

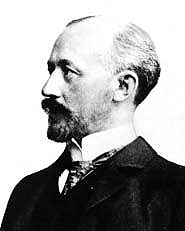
Dolivo-Dobrovolsky

=== I ===
- Andronik Iosifyan, father of Soviet electromechanics, chief constructor of the first Soviet meteorological satellites, inventor of noncontact synchronized transmissions

=== J ===
- Boris Jacobi, inventor of electroplating, electrotyping, galvanoplastic sculpture and electric boat

=== K ===
- Konstantin Khrenov, inventor of underwater welding

=== L ===
- Dmitry Lachinov, inventor of economizer for electricity consumption, electrical insulation tester and optical dynamometer, pioneer of long-distance electricity transmission
- Alexander Lodygin, one of the inventors of incandescent light bulb, inventor of electric streetlight and tungsten filament
- Oleg Losev, inventor of light-emitting diode and crystadine
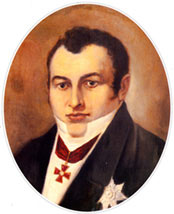
  Schilling

=== P ===
- Vasily Petrov, inventor of electric arc and arc welding
- Fyodor Pirotsky, inventor of railway electrification system and electric tram
- Alexander Poniatoff, inventor of videotape recorder
- Alexander Popov, inventor of lightning detector, one of the inventors of radio

=== R ===
- Georg Wilhelm Richmann, inventor of electrometer, died from ball lightning during an experiment
- Boris Rosing, the first to use cathode ray tube in a TV system

=== S ===
- Pavel Schilling, inventor of shielded cable, electric mine and electromagnetic telegraph
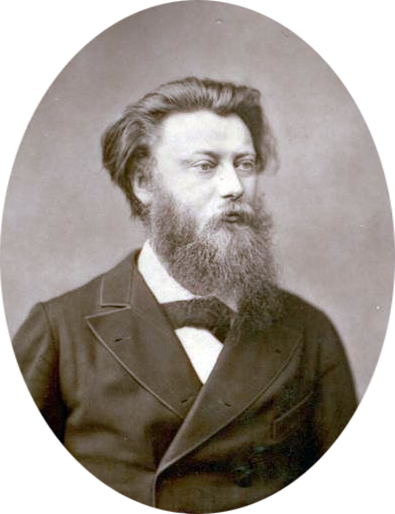
  Yablochkov
- Nikolay Slavyanov, inventor of shielded metal arc welding
- Aleksandr Stoletov, physicist, inventor of photoelectric cell

=== T ===
- Leon Theremin, polymath, inventor of interlace, theremin (the first successful electronic musical instrument), terpsitone and rhythmicon (the first drum machine)

=== Y ===
- Pavel Yablochkov, inventor of Yablochkov candle (the first commercially viable electric lamp), AC transformer and headlamp

=== Z ===
- Vladimir Zworykin, "the Father of television", inventor of iconoscope and kinescope

== See also ==
- List of electrical engineers
- Electrical engineering
- List of Russian inventors
