= Yablochkov (crater) =

Crater on the Moon

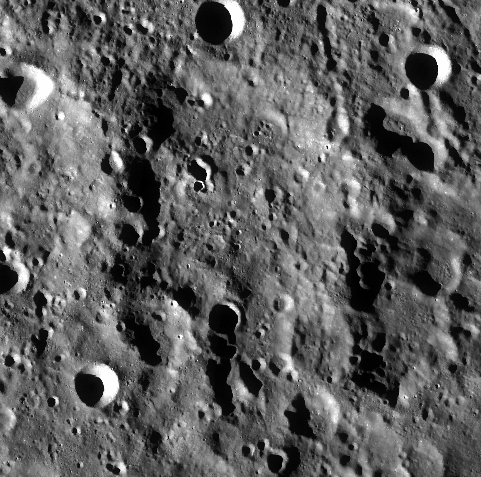
- Coordinates: 60.9°N 128.3°E
- Diameter: 99 km
- Depth: Unknown
- Colongitude: 241° at sunrise
- Eponym: Pavel Yablochkov

Yablochkov is a ruined lunar impact crater that is located on the northern hemisphere of the Moon's far side. It lies almost due south of the large walled plain Schwarzschild.

Both the rim and interior of this feature have been heavily damaged by subsequent impacts, leaving a formation that is little more than a rugged depression in the surface. The most notable of the overlying impacts is Yablochkov U across the northwest rim. Smaller impacts lie across the northern and southern rim. There is a crater-like depression along the southeast inner wall and the floor is marked by several small craterlets.

== Satellite craters ==
By convention these features are identified on lunar maps by placing the letter on the side of the crater midpoint that is closest to Yablochkov.

Yablochkov	Latitude	Longitude	Diameter
U	61.9° N	120.8° E	30 km
