= Elliot Rappaport =

Elliot Rappaport is an electrical engineer at Electro Technology Consultants in Coconut Creek, Florida. He was named a Fellow of the Institute of Electrical and Electronics Engineers (IEEE) in 2012 for his contributions to grounding in industrial and commercial power systems.
