= Serge Pelissou =

Serge Pelissou is an electrical engineer at the Hydro-Québec Research Institute (IREQ) in Varennes, Quebec. He was named a Fellow of the Institute of Electrical and Electronics Engineers (IEEE) in 2013 for his work to characterize extruded cables and components in their life cycles.
