= Mehmet Soyuer =

Mehmet Soyuer from the IBM Thomas J. Watson Research Center, Yorktown Heights, New York, was named Fellow of the Institute of Electrical and Electronics Engineers (IEEE) in 2016 for contributions to the design of high-frequency integrated circuits for clocking and communications.
