= Stephen Renals =

British electrical engineer

Stephen Renals from the University of Edinburgh, UK was named Fellow of the Institute of Electrical and Electronics Engineers (IEEE) in 2014 for contributions to speech recognition technology and its use in spoken language processing.
