= Robert Campbell Aitken =

Canadian electrical engineer

Robert Campbell Aitken (born April 21, 1963) is a Canadian electrical engineer. He was named a Fellow of the Institute of Electrical and Electronics Engineers (IEEE) in 2013 "for contributions to testing and diagnosis of integrated circuits." He has applied for forty-eight patents since 2007, mostly in conjunction with other ARM inventors.

== Education and career ==
Aitken holds Ph.D. from McGill University. He joined the technical staff at Agilent Technologies, Santa Clara, California, in 2004. He later moved to ARM, a British multinational semiconductor and software designer company. In 2018, Aitken was appointed as the 56th Design Automation Conference General Chair.
