= Philip Schniter =

Philip Schniter from Ohio State University, Columbus, OH was named Fellow of the Institute of Electrical and Electronics Engineers (IEEE) in 2014 for contributions to signal processing in communications.
