= Pavel Yablochkov =

Russian electrical engineer (1847–1894)

- Павел Яблочков
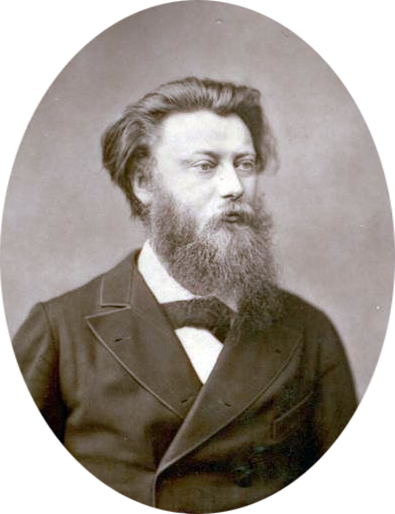
- Born: Pavel Nikolayevich Yablochkov; 14 September 1847; Serdobsky Uyezd, Saratov Governorate, Russian Empire
- Died: 31 March 1894 (aged 46); Saratov, Russian Empire
- Education: Saint Petersburg Nikolaevsky Engineering Academy
- Known for: Inventing the Yablochkov candle
- Engineering career
- Discipline: Electrical engineering
- Significant advance: Arc lamp

Pavel Nikolayevich Yablochkov (also transliterated as Jablochkoff; Russian: Павел Николаевич Яблочков; 14 September [O.S. 2 September] 1847 – 31 March [O.S. 19 March] 1894) was a Russian electrical engineer, businessman and the inventor of the Yablochkov candle, a type of electric carbon arc lamp.

== Biography ==
Yablochkov graduated in 1866 as a military engineer from Nikolayev Engineering Institute, now Military Engineering-Technical University (Russian Военный инженерно-технический университет), and in 1869 from Technical Galvanic School in Saint Petersburg. After serving in the army, Yablochkov settled in Moscow in 1873, where he was appointed Head of Telegraph Office at the Moscow-Kursk railroad. He opened up a workshop for his experiments in electrical engineering, which laid down the foundations for his future inventions in the field of electric lighting, electric machines, galvanic cells and accumulators.

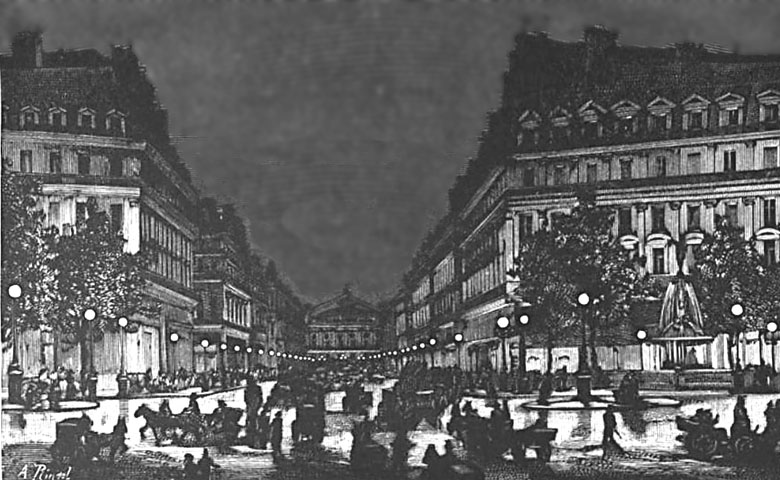
Yablochkov's demonstration of his brilliant arc lights at the 1878 Paris Exposition along the Avenue de l'Opéra triggered a steep sell off of gas utility stocks

Yablochkov's major invention was the first model of an arc lamp that eliminated the mechanical complexity of competing lights that required a regulator to manage the voltaic arc. He went to Paris the same year where he built an industrial sample of the "electric candle" (French patent No. 112024, 1876). It was in Paris that he developed his arc light idea into a complete system of electric lighting powered by Zénobe Gramme direct current dynamos fitted with an inverter to supply single-phase alternating current. The first public use of the Yablochkov system was in October 1877 at Halle Marengo of the Magasins du Louvre which was lit by six Yablochkov candles. By 1880, the system had grown in size to 120 lamps with 84 lit at a time powered by a 100-horsepower steam engine and had been operating every night for two and one half years.

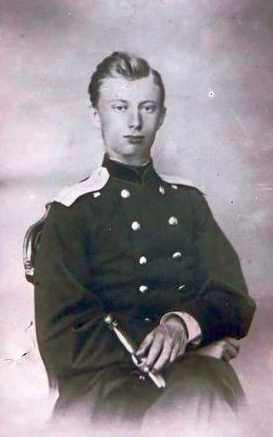
Pavel Yablochkov in 1866

The Paris Exposition of 1878 presented Yablochkov with the unique opportunity to make a spectacular demonstration for a world audience, and through the promotional efforts of Gramme was successful in having 64 of his arc lights installed along the half mile (0.8 km) length of Avenue de l'Opéra, Place du Théâtre Français (today Place André-Malraux) and around the Place de l'Opéra. It was first lit in February 1878. Yablochkov candles required high voltage, and it was not long before experimenters reported that the arc lights could be powered on a 7-mile (11 km) circuit. Yablochkov candles were superior to Lontin-Serrin regulator arc lights that each required a separate Gramme generator. Beginning in 1880, the Paris Hippodrome's 20 Serrin lights powered by 20 generators were replaced by 68 additional Yablochkov candles, based on two years of positive experience with 60 candles powered by just three generators. The impact of the 1878 Paris demonstration was a depression in the value of gas company shares which did not recover until 1880. French, English, and American businessmen quickly set up companies licensing Yablochkov's patents.

As part of his arc lighting patents, Yablochkov described a method of employing Michael Faraday's discovery of induction to create a continuous current of higher voltage, where primary windings were connected to a source of alternating current and secondary windings could be connected to several electric "candles". Although it was not recognized at the time, Yablochkov's idea of using transformers to provide different voltages from the same AC line was the model that modern transmission and distribution systems would settle on. As the patent said such a system "allowed to provide separate supply to several lighting fixtures with different luminous intensities from a single source of electric power". In 1879, Yablochkov established “Electric Lighting Company, P.N. Yablochkov the Inventor and Co” and an electrical plant in Petersburg that would later produce illuminators for military vessels and factories. There was considerable international competition to his arc lights. His lasted only one and a half hours whereas those of Charles F. Brush lasted twice as long.

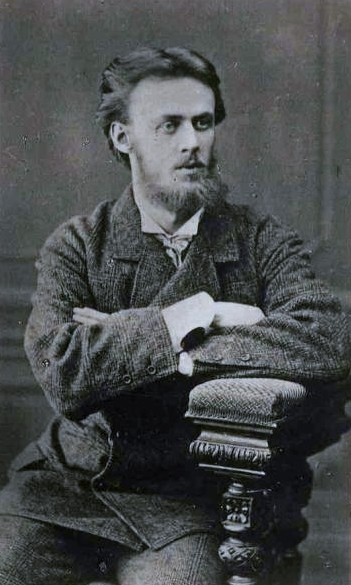
Pavel Yablochkov in 1870s

From the mid-1880s, Yablochkov mostly occupied himself with problems of generating electric energy. He constructed the so-called “magnet dynamo electric machine”, which had most of the features of the modern inductor. Yablochkov did extensive research on transformation of fuel energy into electric energy, suggested a galvanic cell with alkaline electrolyte, and created a regenerative cell (the so-called autoaccumulator).

Yablochkov participated in Electrical engineering exhibitions in Russia (1880 and 1882), Paris (1881 and 1889), and First International Congress of Electricians (1881). For participation in the exhibition and congress, he was awarded the French Order of the Legion of Honor.

== Personal life ==
Yablochkov was an active Freemason. He was initiated in 1876 into the Supreme Council of France of the Scottish Rite. After being "Worshipful Master" of three lodges in Paris, he created a new lodge under the Supreme Council known as "Cosmos" on 25 June 1887. Through this he hoped to attract young and wealthy Russian emigrants in Paris. One member of his lodge was Maksim Kovalevsky, who would later help bring Freemasonry back to Russia and prepare the groundwork for the foundation of the Grand Orient of Russia's Peoples.

== Legacy ==
In 1947, the USSR introduced the Yablochkov Award for the best work in the field of electrical engineering.

The crater Yablochkov on the Moon is named after him.

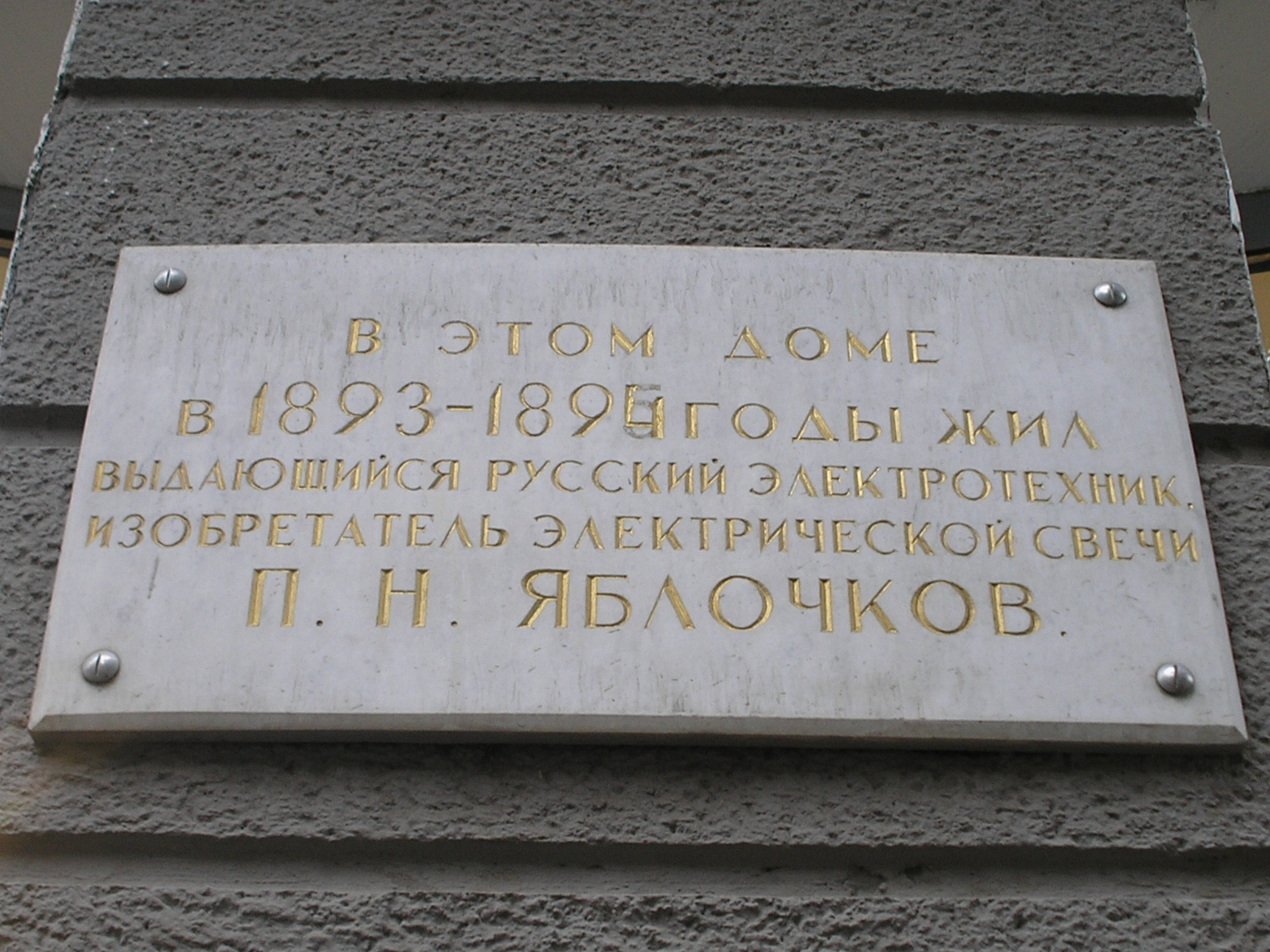
A memorial plaque on the facade of house No. 35 at the corner of M. Gorky and Yablochkov streets (Saratov)

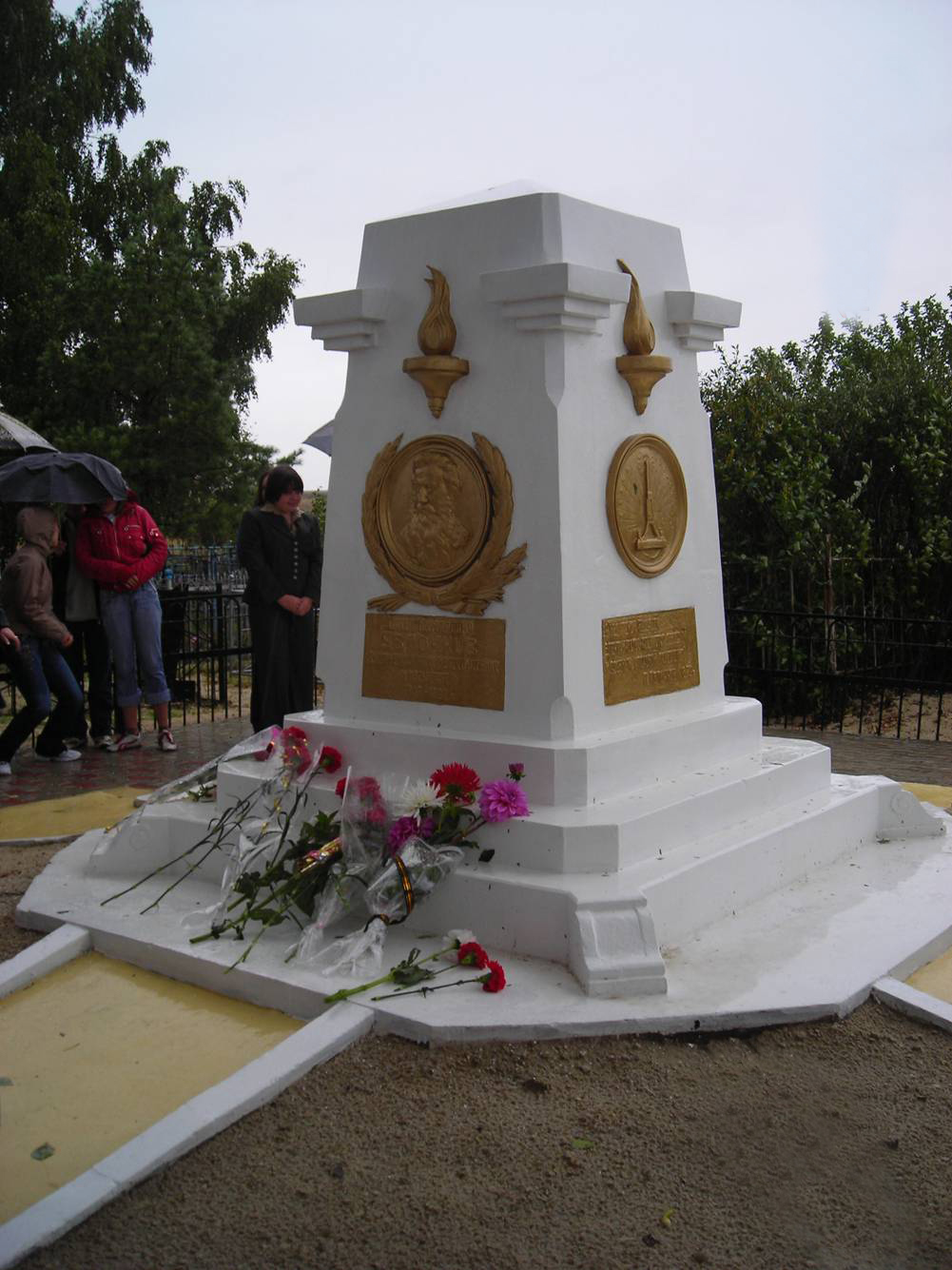
Monument on the grave of P. N. Yablochkov (Sapozhok village, Rtischevsky district)

== See also ==
- Thomas Edison
- Yablochkov candle
- Media related to Pavel Yablochkov at Wikimedia Commons
- Chisholm, Hugh, ed. (1911). "Jablochkov, Paul" . Encyclopædia Britannica (11th ed.). Cambridge University Press.

== Gallery ==
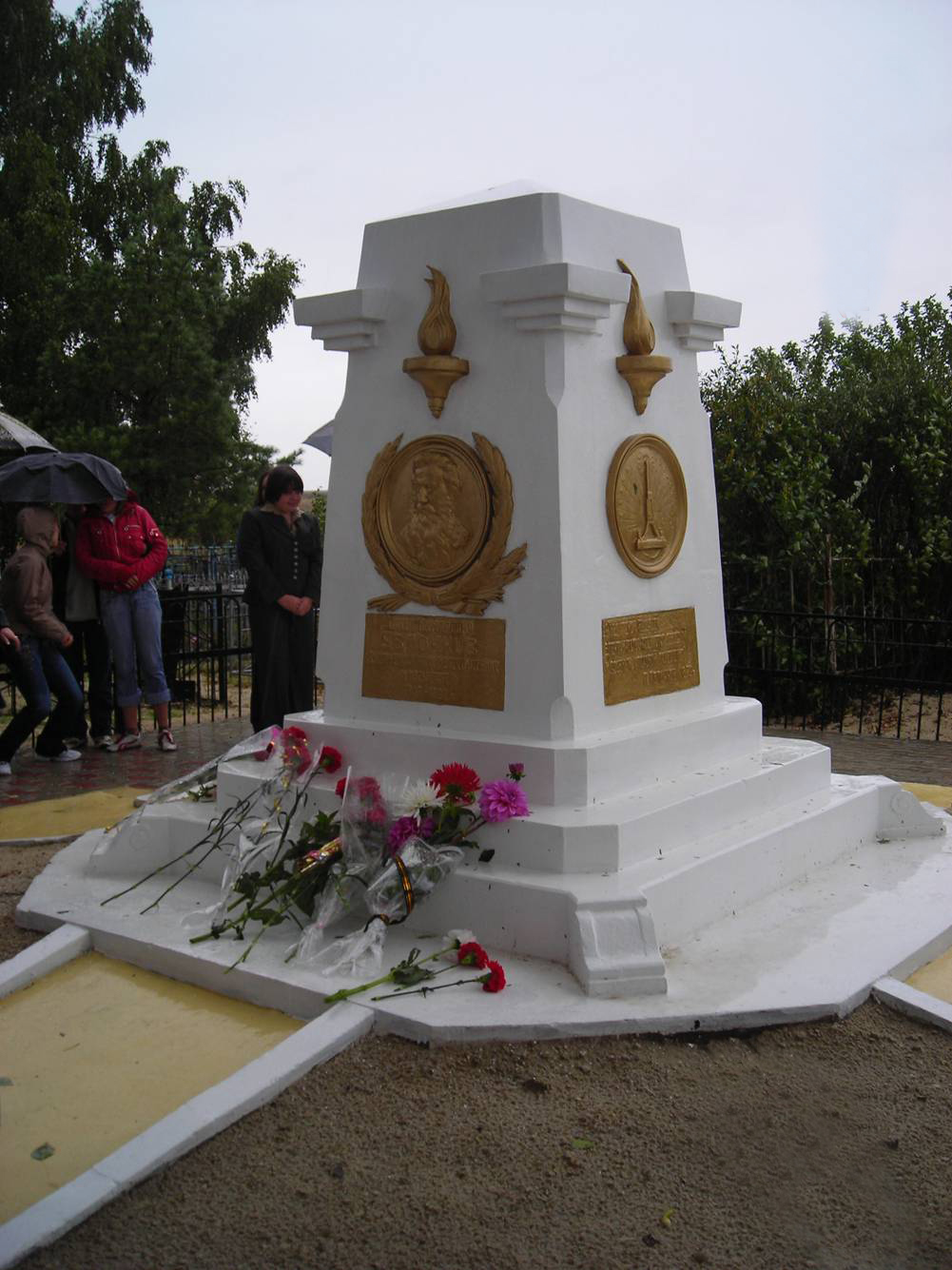
Monument on P. N. Yablochkov's tomb (village Sapozhok, Rtishchevsky area)

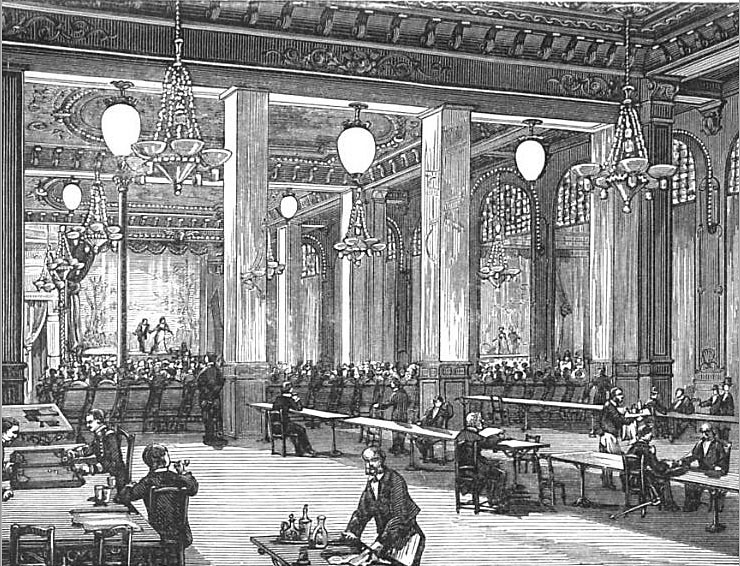
Yablochkov arc lamps illuminating Music hall on la Place du Chateau d'eau in Paris circa 1880.

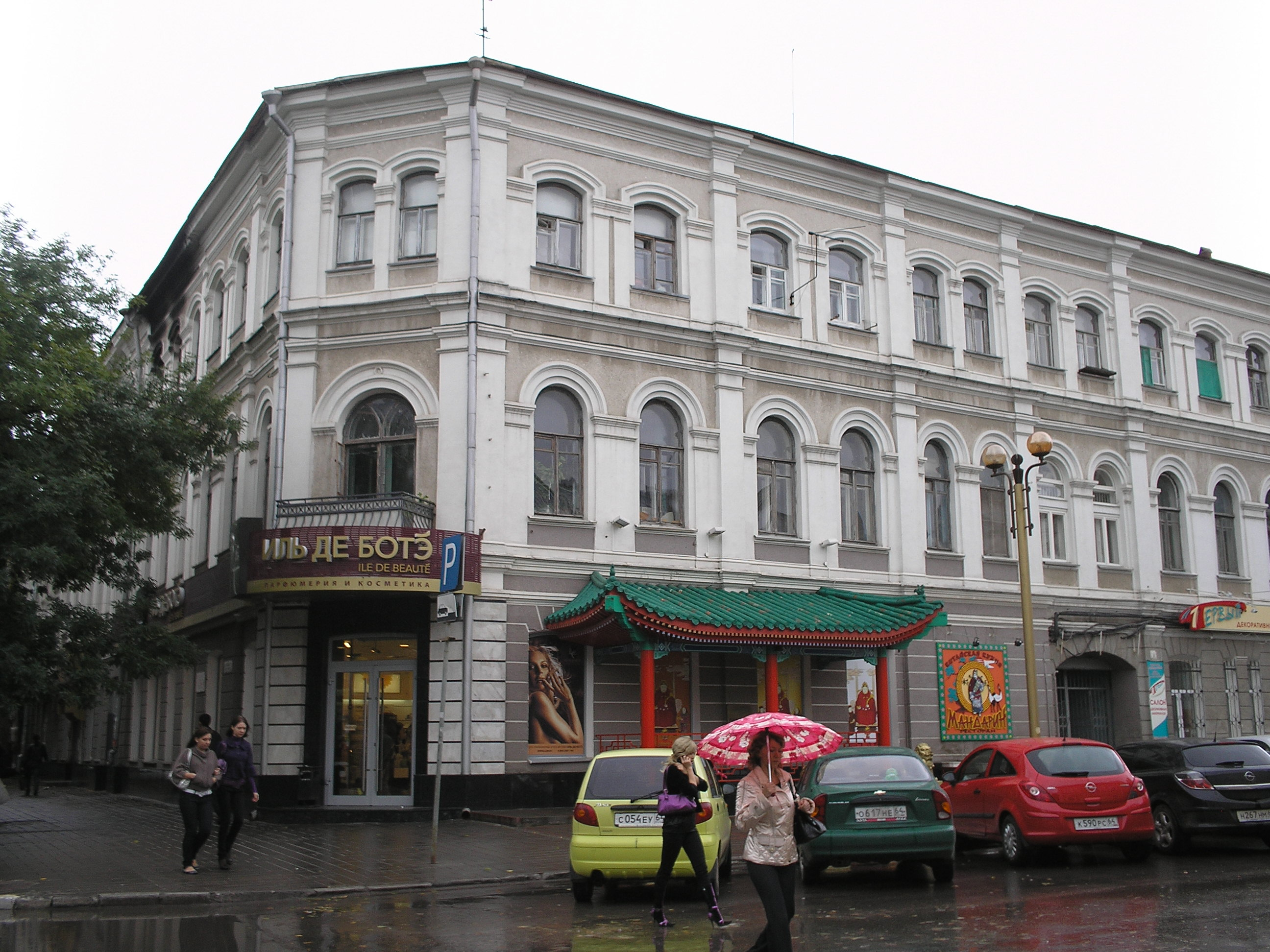
The house in Saratov where Yablochkov lived at the end of his life.

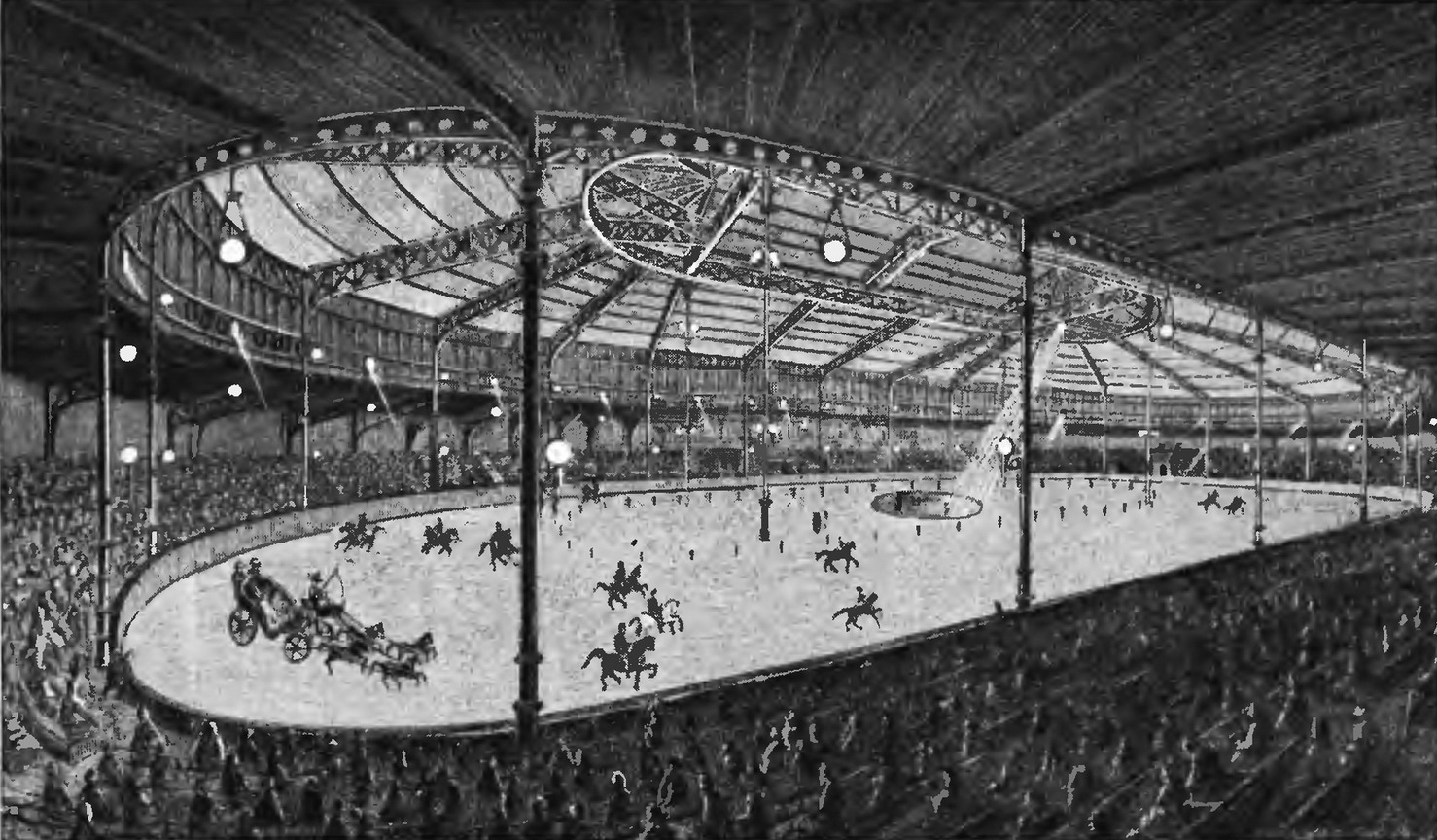
The Paris Hippodrome circa 1881 was lit with 128 Yablochkov candles, with approximately one Gramme generator required per 20 lights.
