= Feng Wu =

Chinese engineer

Feng Wu from Microsoft Research Asia, Beijing, China was named Fellow of the Institute of Electrical and Electronics Engineers (IEEE) in 2013 for contributions to visual data compression and communication.
