= Pengjun Wan =

Pengjun Wan from the Illinois Institute of Technology, Chicago, IL was named Fellow of the Institute of Electrical and Electronics Engineers (IEEE) in 2016 for contributions to scheduling and resource allocation in wireless networks.
