= Senichi Suzuki =

Senichi Suzuki from the NTT Corporation, Kanagawa, Japan was named Fellow of the Institute of Electrical and Electronics Engineers (IEEE) in 2014 for contributions to high-density integrated silica-based planar lightwave circuits for optical communications.
