= Mahesh Viswanathan =

Engineer at IBM

Mahesh Viswanathan is an Distinguished Engineer at Cisco. He was named a Fellow of the Institute of Electrical and Electronics Engineers (IEEE) in 2015 for his contributions to ubiquitous access to cloud computing and to vehicular speech communications.
