= Thyagarajan Nandagopal =

Thyagarajan Nandagopal is an engineer at the National Science Foundation in Arlington, Virginia. He was named a Fellow of the Institute of Electrical and Electronics Engineers (IEEE) in 2016 for his contributions to wireless network optimization, RFID systems, and network architectures.
