= Haruhisa Soda =

Japanese engineer

Haruhisa Soda from the FiBest Limited, Tokyo, Japan was named Fellow of the Institute of Electrical and Electronics Engineers (IEEE) in 2015 for contributions to vertical-cavity surface-emitting and distributed-feedback lasers.
