= Electrical engineering =

Branch of engineering

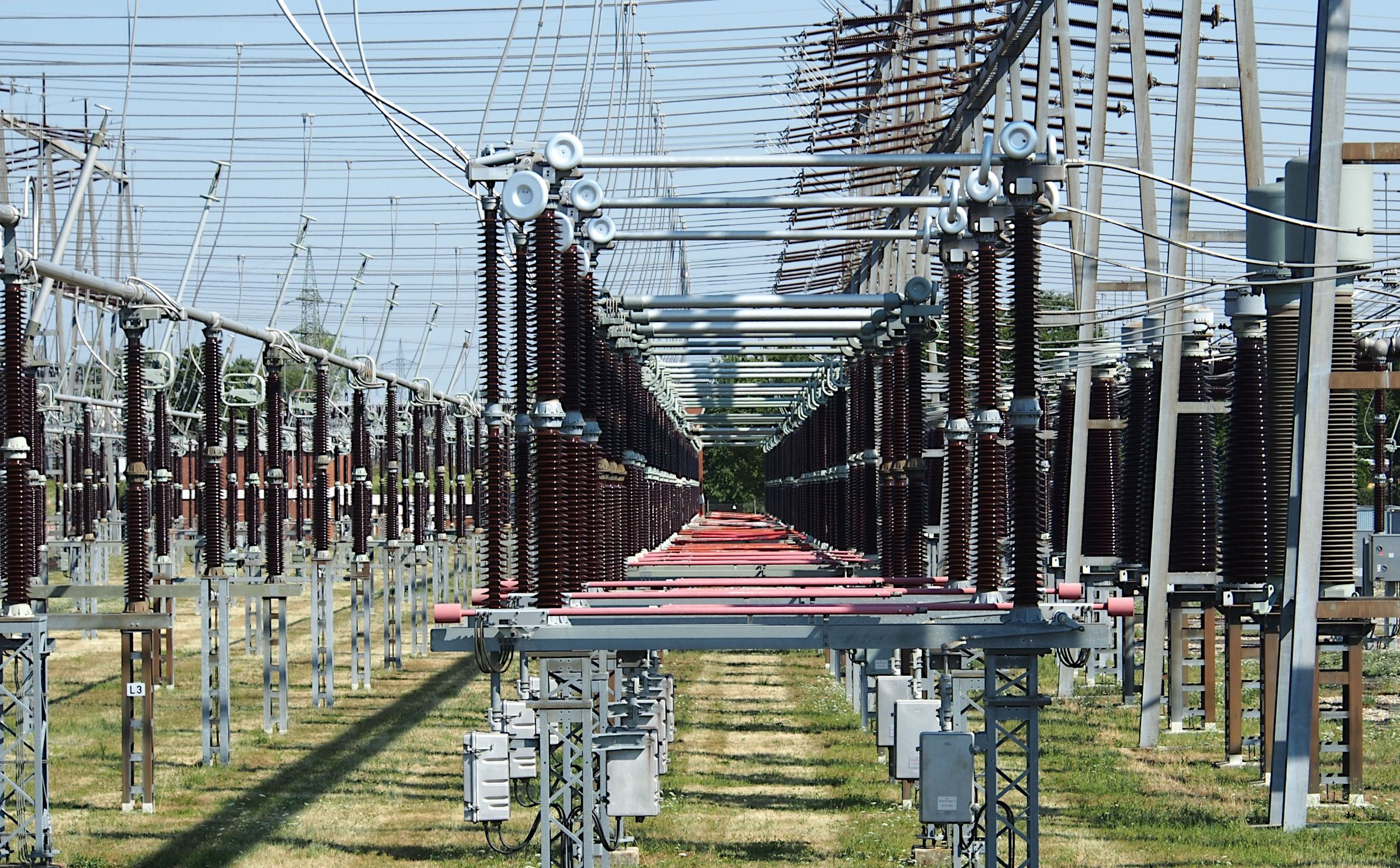
- A long row of disconnectors

Occupation
- Names: Electrical engineer
- Activity sectors: Electronics, electrical circuits, electromagnetics, power engineering, electrical machines, telecommunications, control systems, signal processing, optics, photonics, and electrical substations

Description
- Competencies: Technical knowledge, advanced mathematics, systems design, physics, science, abstract thinking, analytical thinking (see also Glossary of electrical and electronics engineering)
- Fields of employment: Technology, science, exploration, military, industry and society

Electrical engineering is an engineering discipline concerned with the study, design, and application of equipment, devices, and systems that use electricity, electronics, and electromagnetism. It emerged as an identifiable occupation in the latter half of the 19th century after the commercialization of the electric telegraph, the telephone, and electrical power generation, distribution, and use.

Electrical engineering encompasses many different fields, including computer engineering, systems engineering, power engineering, telecommunications, radio-frequency engineering, signal processing, instrumentation, control engineering, photovoltaic cells, electronics, and optics and photonics. Many of these disciplines overlap with other engineering branches, spanning a huge number of specializations including hardware engineering, power electronics, electromagnetics and waves, microwave engineering, nanotechnology, electrochemistry, renewable energies, mechatronics/control, and electrical materials science. (Note: For more see glossary of electrical and electronics engineering.) Machine learning and computer science techniques are also further studied due to being historically developed as fields of electrical engineering.

Electrical engineers typically hold a degree in electrical engineering, electronic or electrical and electronic engineering. Practicing engineers may have professional certification and be members of a professional body or an international standards organization. These include the International Electrotechnical Commission (IEC), the National Society of Professional Engineers (NSPE), the Institute of Electrical and Electronics Engineers (IEEE) and the Institution of Engineering and Technology (IET, formerly the IEE).

Electrical engineers work in a very wide range of industries and the skills required are likewise variable. These range from circuit theory to the management skills of a project manager. The tools and equipment that an individual engineer may need are similarly variable, ranging from a simple voltmeter to sophisticated design and manufacturing software.

== History ==
Electricity has been a subject of scientific interest since at least the early 17th century. William Gilbert was a prominent early electrical scientist, and was the first to draw a clear distinction between magnetism and static electricity. He is credited with establishing the term "electricity". He also designed the versorium: a device that detects the presence of statically charged objects. In 1762 Swedish professor Johan Wilcke invented a device later named electrophorus that produced a static electric charge. By 1800 Alessandro Volta had developed the voltaic pile, a forerunner of the electric battery.

=== 19th century ===
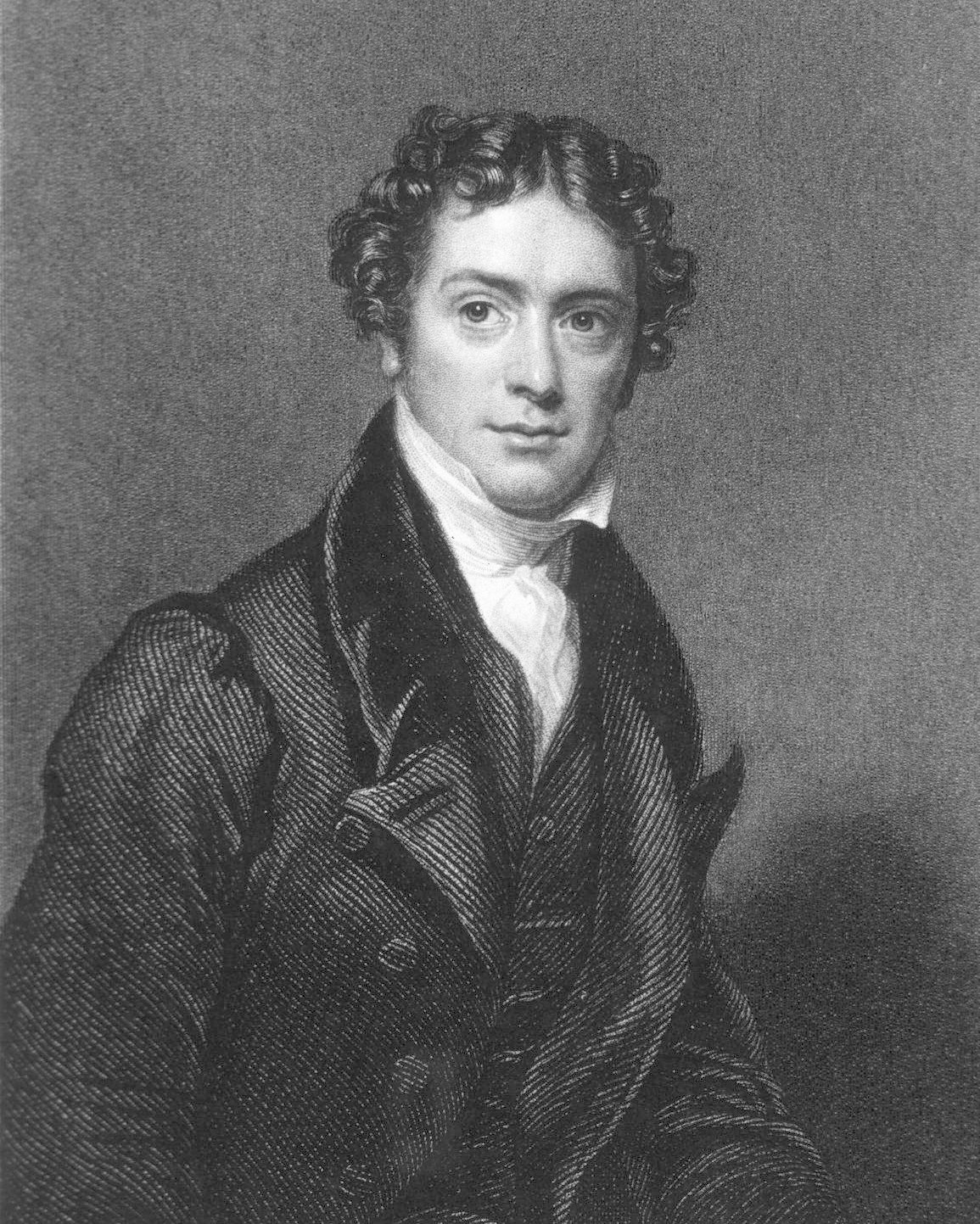
The discoveries of Michael Faraday formed the foundation of electric motor technology.

In the 19th century, research into the subject started to intensify. Notable developments in this century include the work of Hans Christian Ørsted, who discovered in 1820 that an electric current produces a magnetic field that will deflect a compass needle; of William Sturgeon, who in 1825 invented the electromagnet; of Joseph Henry and Edward Davy, who invented the electrical relay in 1835; of Georg Ohm, who in 1827 quantified the relationship between the electric current and potential difference in a conductor; of Michael Faraday, the discoverer of electromagnetic induction in 1831; and of James Clerk Maxwell, who in 1873 published a unified theory of electricity and magnetism in his treatise Electricity and Magnetism.

In 1782, Georges-Louis Le Sage developed and presented in Berlin probably the world's first form of electric telegraphy, using 24 different wires, one for each letter of the alphabet. This telegraph connected two rooms. It was an electrostatic telegraph that moved gold leaf through electrical conduction.

In 1795, Francisco Salva Campillo proposed an electrostatic telegraph system. Between 1803 and 1804, he worked on electrical telegraphy, and in 1804, he presented his report at the Royal Academy of Natural Sciences and Arts of Barcelona. Salva's electrolyte telegraph system was very innovative though it was greatly influenced by and based upon two discoveries made in Europe in 1800—Alessandro Volta's electric battery for generating an electric current and William Nicholson and Anthony Carlyle's electrolysis of water. Electrical telegraphy may be considered the first example of electrical engineering. Electrical engineering became a profession in the later 19th century. Practitioners had created a global electric telegraph network, and the first professional electrical engineering institutions were founded in the UK and the US to support the new discipline. Francis Ronalds created an electric telegraph system in 1816 and documented his vision of how the world could be transformed by electricity. Over 50 years later, he joined the new Society of Telegraph Engineers (soon to be renamed the Institution of Electrical Engineers) where he was regarded by other members as the first of their cohort. By the end of the 19th century, the world had been forever changed by the rapid communication made possible by the engineering development of land-lines, submarine cables, and, from about 1890, wireless telegraphy.

Practical applications and advances in such fields created an increasing need for standardized units of measure. They led to the international standardization of the units volt, ampere, coulomb, ohm, farad, and henry. This was achieved at an international conference in Chicago in 1893. The publication of these standards formed the basis of future advances in standardization in various industries, and in many countries, the definitions were immediately recognized in relevant legislation.

During these years, the study of electricity was largely considered to be a subfield of physics since early electrical technology was considered electromechanical in nature. The Technische Universität Darmstadt founded the world's first department of electrical engineering in 1882 and introduced the first-degree course in electrical engineering in 1883. The first electrical engineering degree program in the United States was started at Massachusetts Institute of Technology (MIT) in the physics department under Professor Charles Cross, though it was Cornell University to produce the world's first electrical engineering graduates in 1885. The first course in electrical engineering was taught in 1883 in Cornell's Sibley College of Mechanical Engineering and Mechanic Arts.

In about 1885, Cornell President Andrew Dickson White established the first Department of Electrical Engineering in the United States. In the same year, University College London founded the first chair of electrical engineering in Great Britain. Professor Mendell P. Weinbach at University of Missouri established the electrical engineering department in 1886. Afterwards, universities and institutes of technology gradually started to offer electrical engineering programs to their students all over the world.

During these decades the use of electrical engineering increased dramatically. In 1882, Thomas Edison switched on the world's first large-scale electric power network that provided 110 volts—direct current (DC)—to 59 customers on Manhattan Island in New York City. In 1884, Sir Charles Parsons invented the steam turbine allowing for more efficient electric power generation. Alternating current, with its ability to transmit power more efficiently over long distances via the use of transformers, developed rapidly in the 1880s and 1890s with transformer designs by Károly Zipernowsky, Ottó Bláthy and Miksa Déri (later called ZBD transformers), Lucien Gaulard, John Dixon Gibbs and William Stanley Jr. Practical AC motor designs including induction motors were independently invented by Galileo Ferraris and Nikola Tesla and further developed into a practical three-phase form by Mikhail Dolivo-Dobrovolsky and Charles Eugene Lancelot Brown. Charles Steinmetz and Oliver Heaviside contributed to the theoretical basis of alternating current engineering. The spread in the use of AC set off in the United States what has been called the war of the currents between a George Westinghouse backed AC system and a Thomas Edison backed DC power system, with AC being adopted as the overall standard.

=== Early 20th century ===
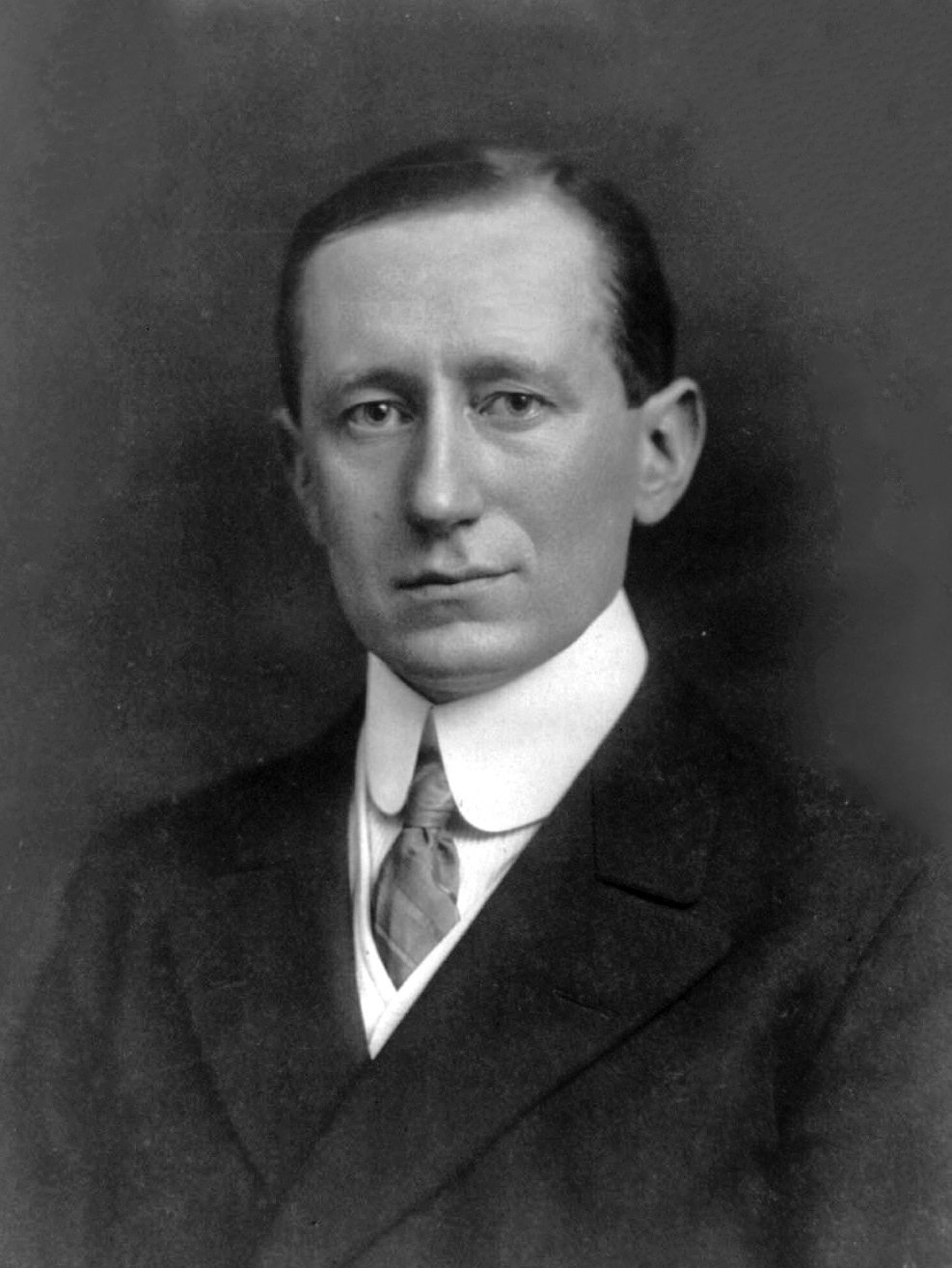
Guglielmo Marconi, known for his pioneering work on long-distance radio transmission

During the development of radio, many scientists and inventors contributed to radio technology and electronics. The mathematical work of James Clerk Maxwell during the 1850s had shown the relationship of different forms of electromagnetic radiation, including the possibility of invisible airborne waves (later called "radio waves"). In his classic physics experiments of 1888, Heinrich Hertz proved Maxwell's theory by transmitting radio waves with a spark-gap transmitter, and detected them by using simple electrical devices. Other physicists experimented with these new waves and, in the process, developed devices for transmitting and detecting them. In 1895, Guglielmo Marconi began work on a way to adapt the known methods of transmitting and detecting these "Hertzian waves" into a purpose-built commercial wireless telegraphic system. Early on, he sent wireless signals over a distance of one and a half miles. In December 1901, he sent wireless waves that were not affected by the curvature of the Earth. Marconi later transmitted the wireless signals across the Atlantic between Poldhu, Cornwall, and St. John's, Newfoundland, a distance of 2,100 miles (3,400 km).

Millimetre wave communication was first investigated by Jagadish Chandra Bose during 1894–1896, when he reached an extremely high frequency of up to 60 GHz in his experiments. He also introduced the use of semiconductor junctions to detect radio waves, when he patented the radio crystal detector in 1901.

In 1897, Karl Ferdinand Braun introduced the cathode-ray tube as part of an oscilloscope, a crucial enabling technology for electronic television. John Fleming invented the first radio tube, the diode, in 1904. Two years later, Robert von Lieben and Lee De Forest independently developed the amplifier tube, called the triode.

In 1920, Albert Hull developed the magnetron, which eventually led to the development of the microwave oven in 1946 by Percy Spencer. In 1934, the British military began to make strides toward radar (which also uses the magnetron) under the direction of Dr Wimperis, culminating in the operation of the first radar station at Bawdsey in August 1936.

In 1941, Konrad Zuse presented the Z3, the world's first fully functional and programmable computer using electromechanical parts. In 1943, Tommy Flowers designed and built the Colossus, the world's first fully functional, electronic, digital and programmable computer. In 1946, the ENIAC (Electronic Numerical Integrator and Computer) of John Presper Eckert and John Mauchly followed, beginning the computing era. The arithmetic performance of these machines allowed engineers to develop completely new technologies and achieve new objectives.

In 1948, Claude Shannon published "A Mathematical Theory of Communication" which mathematically describes the passage of information with uncertainty (electrical noise).

=== Solid-state electronics ===
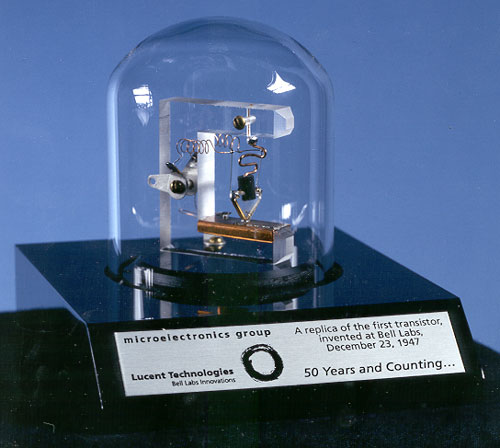
A replica of the first working transistor, a point-contact transistor

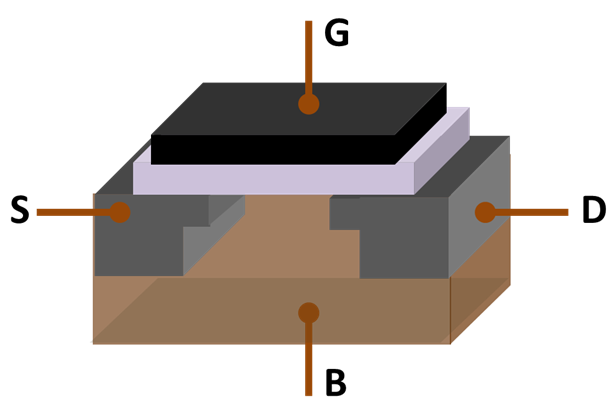
Metal–oxide–semiconductor field-effect transistor (MOSFET), the basic building block of modern electronics

The first working transistor was a point-contact transistor invented by John Bardeen and Walter Houser Brattain while working under William Shockley at the Bell Telephone Laboratories (BTL) in 1947. They then invented the bipolar junction transistor in 1948. While early junction transistors were relatively bulky devices that were difficult to manufacture on a mass-production basis, they opened the door for more compact devices.

The first integrated circuits were the hybrid integrated circuit invented by Jack Kilby at Texas Instruments in 1958 and the monolithic integrated circuit chip invented by Robert Noyce at Fairchild Semiconductor in 1959.

The MOSFET (metal–oxide–semiconductor field-effect transistor, or MOS transistor) was invented by Mohamed Atalla and Dawon Kahng at BTL in 1959. It was the first truly compact transistor that could be miniaturised and mass-produced for a wide range of uses. It revolutionized the electronics industry, becoming the most widely used electronic device in the world.

The MOSFET made it possible to build high-density integrated circuit chips. The earliest experimental MOS IC chip to be fabricated was built by Fred Heiman and Steven Hofstein at RCA Laboratories in 1962. MOS technology enabled Moore's law, the doubling of transistors on an IC chip every two years, predicted by Gordon Moore in 1965. Silicon-gate MOS technology was developed by Federico Faggin at Fairchild in 1968. Since then, the MOSFET has been the basic building block of modern electronics. The mass-production of silicon MOSFETs and MOS integrated circuit chips, along with continuous MOSFET scaling miniaturization at an exponential pace (as predicted by Moore's law), has since led to revolutionary changes in technology, economy, culture and thinking.

The Apollo program which culminated in landing astronauts on the Moon with Apollo 11 in 1969 was enabled by NASA's adoption of advances in semiconductor electronic technology, including MOSFETs in the Interplanetary Monitoring Platform (IMP) and silicon integrated circuit chips in the Apollo Guidance Computer (AGC).

The development of MOS integrated circuit technology in the 1960s led to the invention of the microprocessor in the early 1970s. The first single-chip microprocessor was the Intel 4004, released in 1971. The Intel 4004 was designed and realized by Federico Faggin at Intel with his silicon-gate MOS technology, along with Intel's Marcian Hoff and Stanley Mazor and Busicom's Masatoshi Shima. The microprocessor led to the development of microcomputers and personal computers, and the microcomputer revolution.

=== Electrical Engineering and Artificial Intelligence ===
In recent times, the subject of machine learning (including speech systems, computer vision and reinforcement learning) has had significant overlap with electrical engineering fields such as signal processing, image processing and control engineering, and is, as such, studied often by electrical engineers. Machine learning techniques are also used in electrical engineering systems in subfields such as electronic design automation, stochastic and adaptive control, smart grids, adaptive signal processing, etc.

== Subfields ==
One of the properties of electricity is that it is very useful for energy transmission as well as for information transmission. These were also the first areas in which electrical engineering was developed. Today, electrical engineering has many subdisciplines, the most common of which are listed below. Although there are electrical engineers who focus exclusively on one of these subdisciplines, many deal with a combination of them. Sometimes, certain fields, such as electronic engineering and computer engineering, are considered disciplines in their own right.

=== Power and energy ===
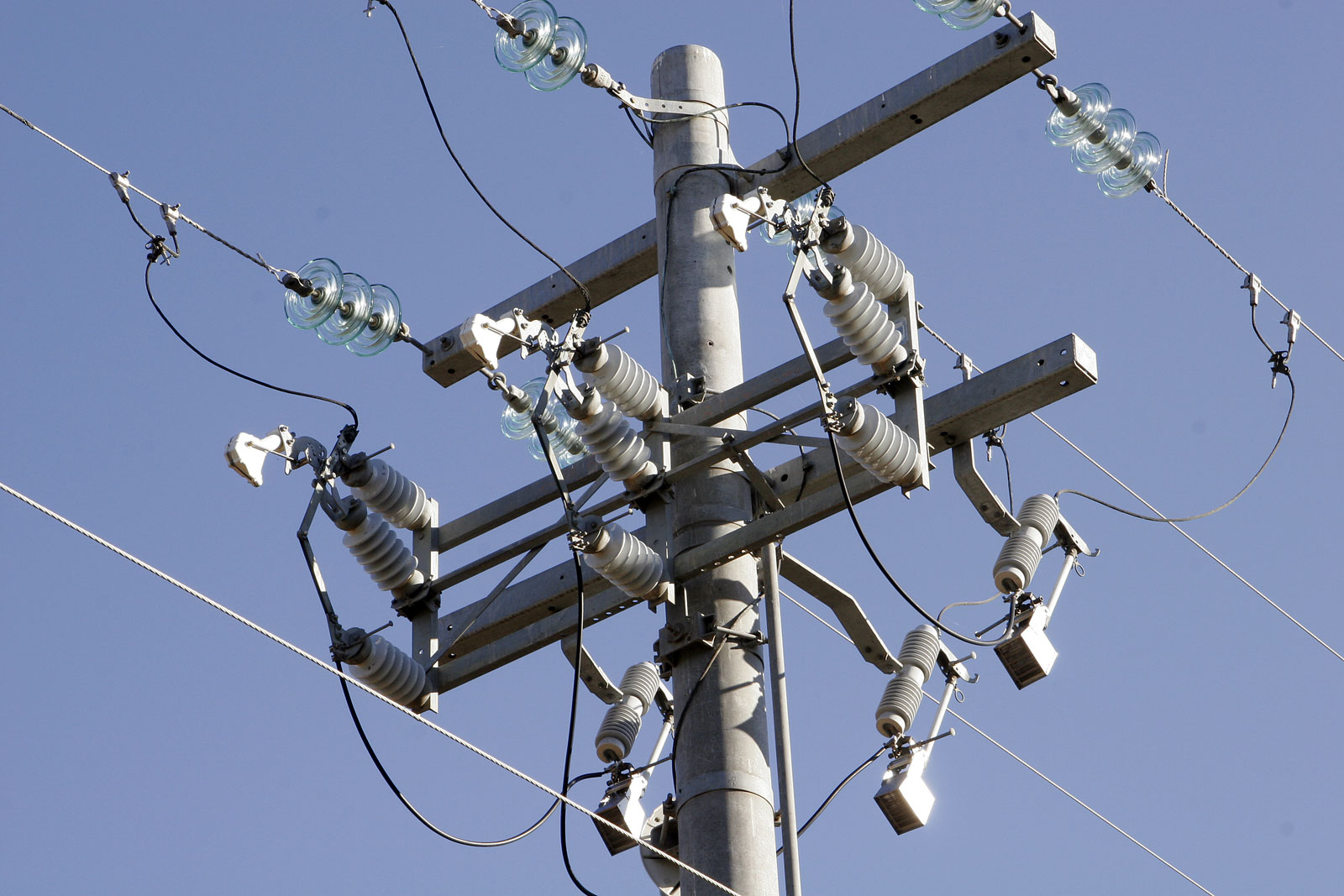
The top of a power pole

Power & Energy engineering deals with the generation, transmission, and distribution of electricity as well as the design of a range of related devices. These include transformers, electric generators, electric motors, high voltage engineering, and power electronics. In many regions of the world, governments maintain an electrical network called a power grid that connects a variety of generators together with users of their energy. Users purchase electrical energy from the grid, avoiding the costly exercise of having to generate their own. Power engineers may work on the design and maintenance of the power grid as well as the power systems that connect to it. Such systems are called on-grid power systems and may supply the grid with additional power, draw power from the grid, or do both. Power engineers may also work on systems that do not connect to the grid, called off-grid power systems, which in some cases are preferable to on-grid systems.

=== Telecommunications ===
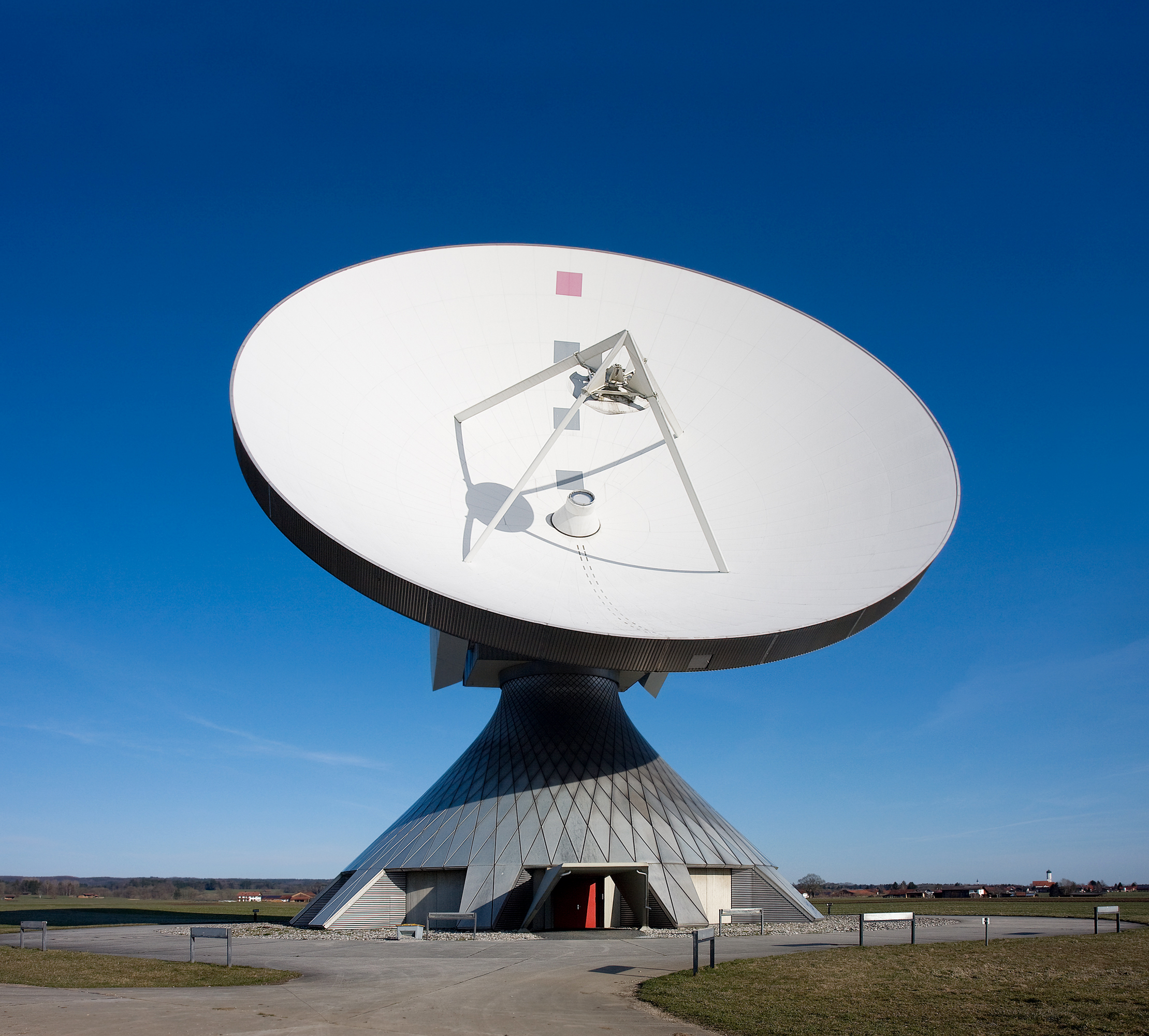
Satellite dishes are a crucial component in the analysis of satellite information.

Telecommunications engineering focuses on the transmission of information across a communication channel such as a coax cable, optical fiber or free space. Transmissions across free space require information to be encoded in a carrier signal to shift the information to a carrier frequency suitable for transmission; this is known as modulation. Popular analog modulation techniques include amplitude modulation and frequency modulation. The choice of modulation affects the cost and performance of a system and these two factors must be balanced carefully by the engineer.

Once the transmission characteristics of a system are determined, telecommunication engineers design the transmitters and receivers needed for such systems. These two are sometimes combined to form a two-way communication device known as a transceiver. A key consideration in the design of transmitters is their power consumption as this is closely related to their signal strength. Typically, if the power of the transmitted signal is insufficient once the signal arrives at the receiver's antenna(s), the information contained in the signal will be corrupted by noise, specifically static.

=== Control engineering ===
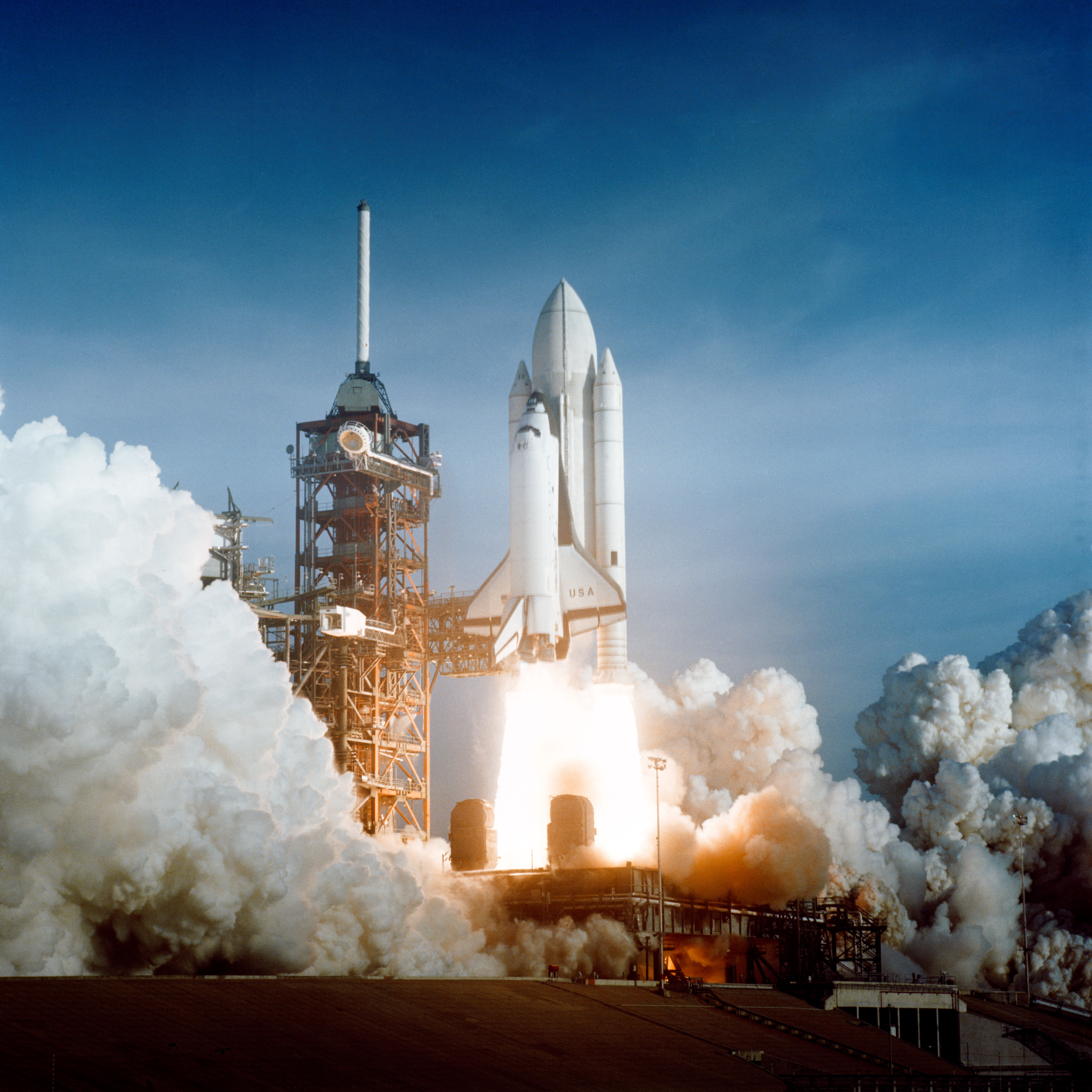
Control systems play a critical role in spaceflight.

Control engineering focuses on the modeling of a diverse range of dynamic systems and the design of controllers that will cause these systems to behave in the desired manner. To implement such controllers, electronics control engineers may use electronic circuits, digital signal processors, microcontrollers, and programmable logic controllers (PLCs). Control engineering has a wide range of applications from the flight and propulsion systems of commercial airliners to the cruise control present in many modern automobiles. It also plays an important role in industrial automation.

Control engineers often use feedback when designing control systems. For example, in an automobile with cruise control, the vehicle's speed is continuously monitored and fed back to the system, which adjusts the motor's power output accordingly. Where there is regular feedback, control theory can be used to determine how the system responds to such feedback.

Control engineers also work in robotics to design autonomous systems using control algorithms which interpret sensory feedback to control actuators that move robots such as autonomous vehicles, autonomous drones and others used in a variety of industries.

=== Electronics ===
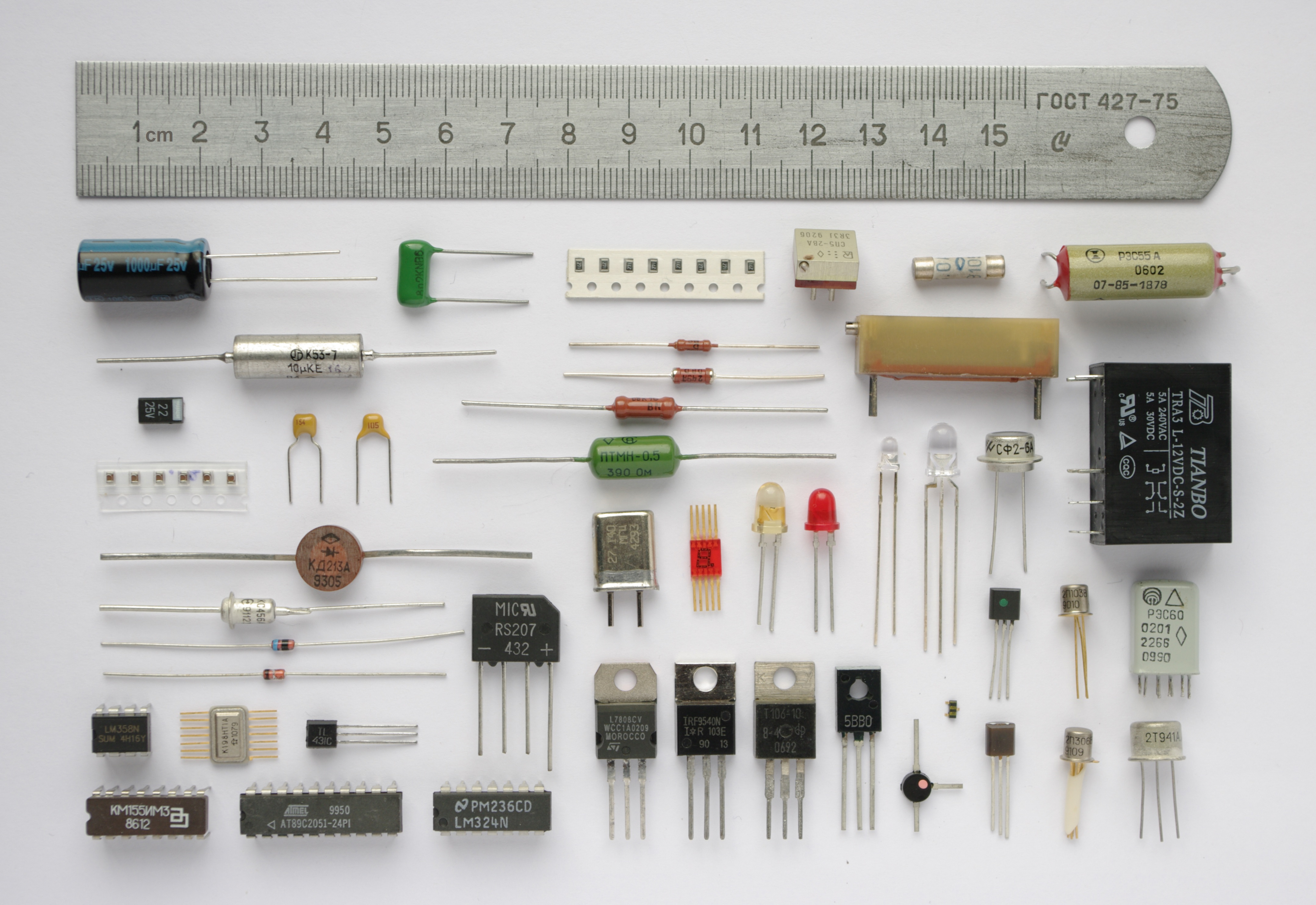
Electronic components

Electronic engineering involves the design and testing of electronic circuits that use the properties of components such as resistors, capacitors, inductors, diodes, and transistors to achieve a particular functionality. The tuned circuit, which allows the user of a radio to filter out all but a single station, is just one example of such a circuit. Another example to research is a pneumatic signal conditioner.

Prior to the Second World War, the subject was commonly known as radio engineering and basically was restricted to aspects of communications and radar, commercial radio, and early television. Later, in post-war years, as consumer devices began to be developed, the field grew to include modern television, audio systems, computers, and microprocessors. In the mid-to-late 1950s, the term radio engineering gradually gave way to the name electronic engineering.

Before the invention of the integrated circuit in 1959, electronic circuits were constructed from discrete components that could be manipulated by humans. These discrete circuits consumed much space and power and were limited in speed, although they are still common in some applications. By contrast, integrated circuits packed a large number—often millions—of tiny electrical components, mainly transistors, into a small chip around the size of a coin. This allowed for the powerful computers and other electronic devices we see today.

=== Microelectronics and nanoelectronics ===
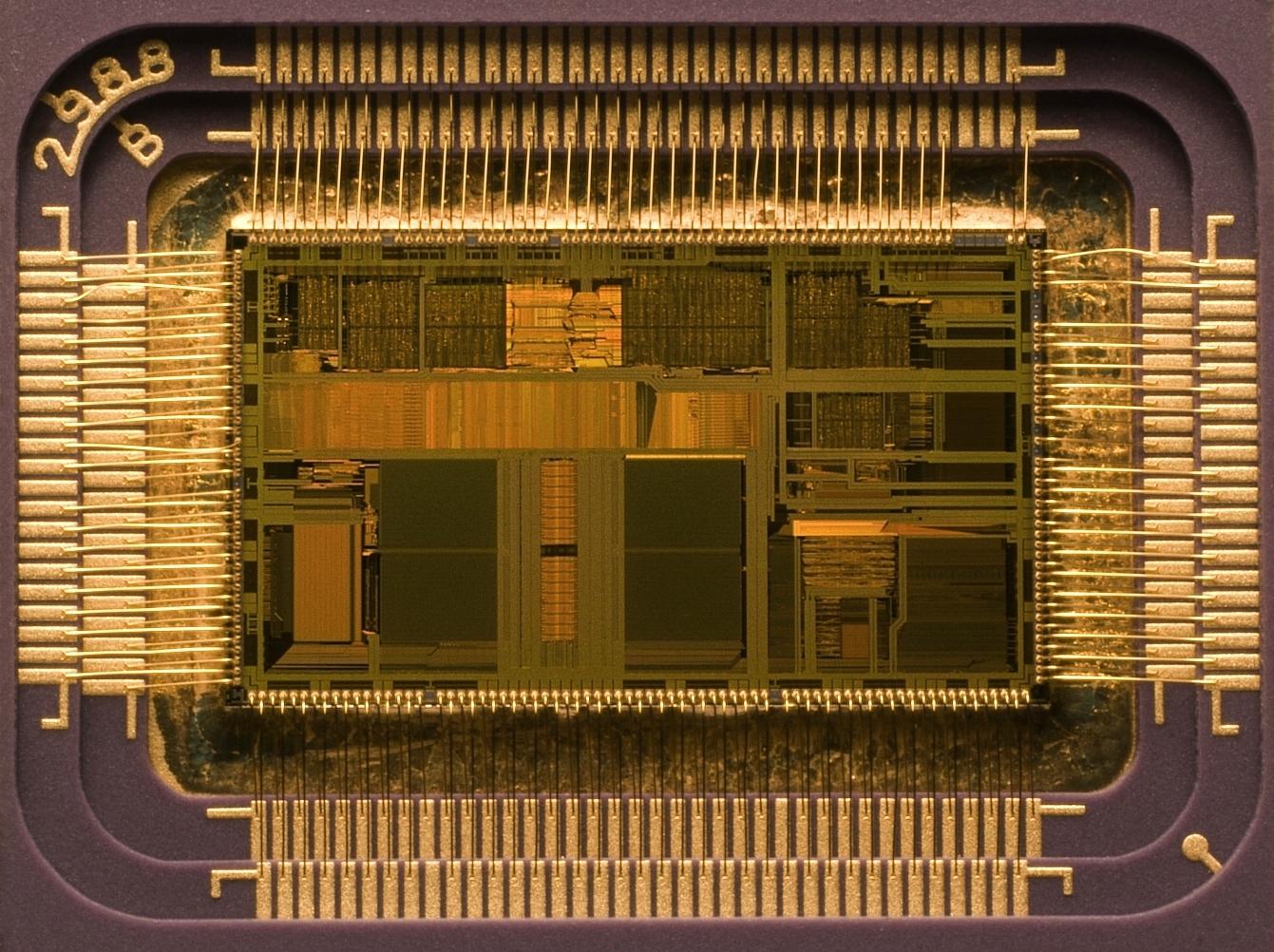
Microprocessor

Microelectronics engineering deals with the design and microfabrication of very small electronic circuit components for use in an integrated circuit or sometimes for use on their own as a general electronic component. The most common microelectronic components are semiconductor transistors, although all main electronic components (resistors, capacitors, etc.) can be created at a microscopic level.

Nanoelectronics is the further scaling of devices down to nanometer levels. Modern devices are already in the nanometer regime, with below 100 nm processing having been standard since around 2002.

Microelectronic components are created by chemically fabricating wafers of semiconductors such as silicon (at higher frequencies, compound semiconductors like gallium arsenide and indium phosphide can be used) to obtain the desired transport of electric charge and current. The field of microelectronics involves a significant amount of chemistry and material science and requires the electronic engineer to have a working knowledge of the effects of quantum mechanics.

=== Signal processing ===
A Bayer filter on a CCD requires signal processing to get a red, green, and blue value at each pixel.

Signal processing deals with the analysis and manipulation of signals. Signals can be either analog, in which case the signal varies continuously according to the information, or digital, in which case the signal varies according to a series of discrete values representing the information. For analog signals, signal processing may involve the amplification and filtering of audio signals for audio equipment or the modulation and demodulation of signals for telecommunications. For digital signals, signal processing may involve the compression, error detection and error correction of digitally sampled signals.

Signal processing is a mathematically oriented area forming the core of digital signal processing and is rapidly expanding with new applications in multiple fields of electrical engineering such as communications, control, radar, audio engineering, broadcast engineering, power electronics, and biomedical engineering as many already existing analog systems are replaced with their digital counterparts. Analog signal processing is still important in the design of many control systems.

DSP processor ICs are found in many types of modern electronic devices, such as digital television sets, radios, hi-fi audio equipment, mobile phones, multimedia players, camcorders and digital cameras, automobile control systems, noise cancelling headphones, digital spectrum analyzers, missile guidance systems, radar systems, and telematics systems. In such products, DSP may be responsible for noise reduction, speech recognition or synthesis, encoding or decoding digital media, wirelessly transmitting or receiving data, triangulating positions using GPS, and other kinds of image processing, video processing, audio processing, and speech processing.

=== Instrumentation ===
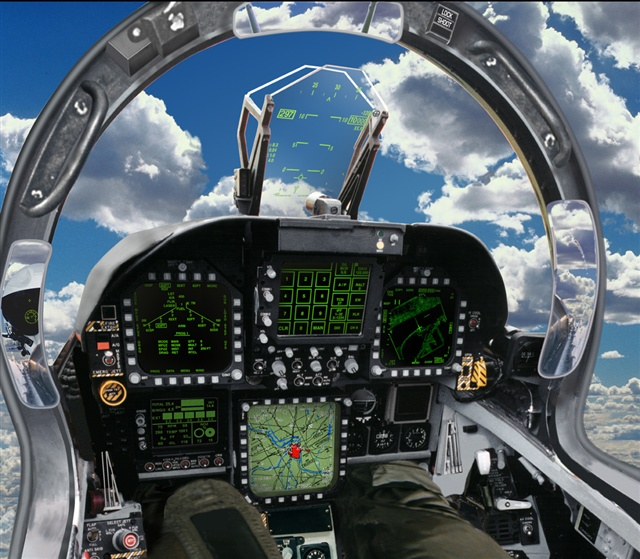
Flight instruments provide pilots with the tools to control aircraft analytically.

Instrumentation engineering deals with the design of devices to measure physical quantities such as pressure, flow, and temperature. The design of such instruments requires a good understanding of physics that often extends beyond electromagnetic theory. For example, flight instruments measure variables such as wind speed and altitude to enable pilots to control the aircraft analytically. Similarly, thermocouples use the Peltier-Seebeck effect to measure the temperature difference between two points.

Often instrumentation is not used by itself, but instead as the sensors of larger electrical systems. For example, a thermocouple might be used to help ensure a furnace's temperature remains constant. For this reason, instrumentation engineering is often viewed as the counterpart of control.

=== Computers ===
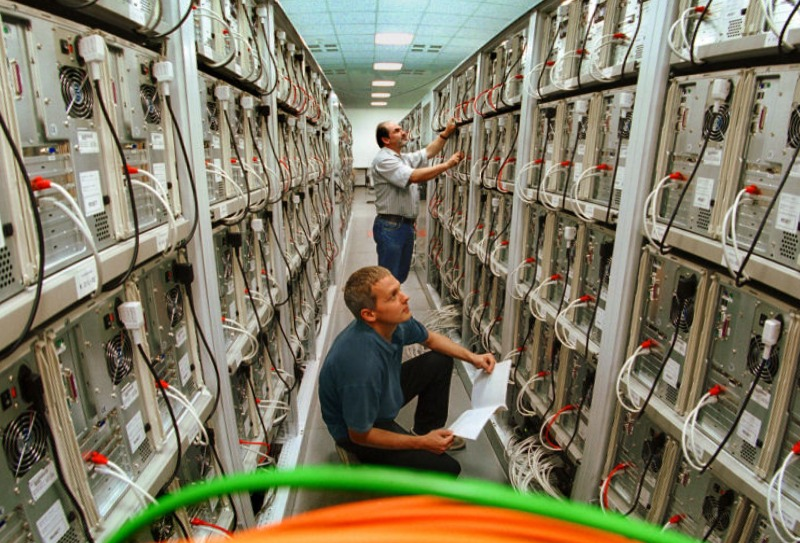
Supercomputers are used in fields as diverse as computational biology and geographic information systems.

Computer engineering deals with the design of computers and computer systems. This may involve the design of new hardware. Computer engineers may also work on a system's software. However, the design of complex software systems is often the domain of software engineering, which is usually considered a separate discipline. Desktop computers represent a tiny fraction of the devices a computer engineer might work on, as computer-like architectures are now found in a range of embedded devices including video game consoles and DVD players. Computer engineers are involved in many hardware and software aspects of computing. Robots are one of the applications of computer engineering.

=== Photonics and optics ===
Electromagnetic spectrum showing wavelengths from radio waves (1 km) to gamma rays (0.01 nm). Visible light Information transmission in electrical engineering applications most frequently uses infrared light in the C band (1530–1565 nm).

Photonics and optics deal with the generation, transmission, amplification, modulation, detection, and analysis of electromagnetic radiation. The application of optics deals with design of optical instruments such as lenses, microscopes, telescopes, and other equipment that uses the properties of electromagnetic radiation. Other prominent applications of optics include electro-optical sensors and measurement systems, lasers, fiber-optic communication systems, and optical disc systems (e.g., CD and DVD). Photonics builds heavily on optical technology, supplemented with modern developments such as optoelectronics (mostly involving semiconductors), laser systems, optical amplifiers and novel materials (e.g. metamaterials).

== Related disciplines ==
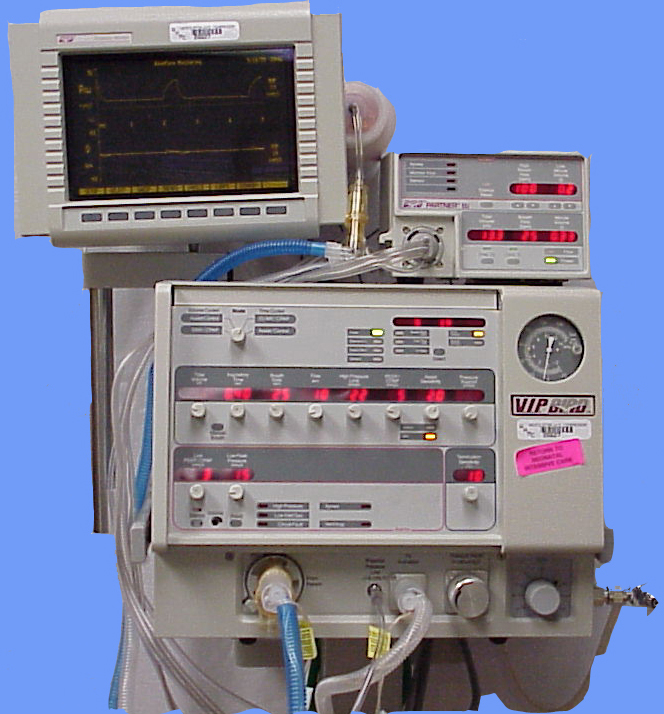
The Bird VIP Infant ventilator

Mechatronics is an engineering discipline that deals with the convergence of electrical and mechanical systems. Such combined systems are known as electromechanical systems and have widespread adoption. Examples include automated manufacturing systems, heating, ventilation and air-conditioning systems, and various subsystems of aircraft and automobiles. Electronic systems design is the subject within electrical engineering that deals with the multi-disciplinary design issues of complex electrical and mechanical systems.

The term mechatronics is typically used to refer to macroscopic systems, but futurists have predicted the emergence of very small electromechanical devices. Already, such small devices, known as microelectromechanical systems (MEMS), are used in automobiles to tell airbags when to deploy, in digital projectors to create sharper images, and in inkjet printers to create nozzles for high definition printing. In the future, it is hoped the devices will help build tiny implantable medical devices and improve optical communication.

In aerospace engineering and robotics, an example is the most recent electric propulsion and ion propulsion.

== Education ==
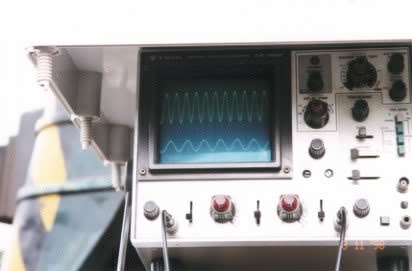
Oscilloscope

Electrical engineers typically possess an academic degree with a major in electrical engineering, electronics engineering, electronics and computer engineering, electrical engineering technology, or electrical and electronic engineering. The same fundamental principles are taught in all programs, though emphasis may vary according to title. The length of study for such a degree is usually four or five years and the completed degree may be designated as a Bachelor of Science in Electrical/Electronics Engineering Technology, Bachelor of Engineering, Bachelor of Science, Bachelor of Technology, or Bachelor of Applied Science, depending on the university. The bachelor's degree generally includes units covering physics, mathematics, computer science, project management, and a variety of topics in electrical engineering. Initially, such topics cover most, if not all, of the subdisciplines of electrical engineering.

An example circuit diagram, which is useful in circuit design and troubleshooting

At many schools, electronic engineering is included as part of an electrical award, sometimes explicitly, such as a Bachelor of Engineering (Electrical and Electronic), but in others, electrical and electronic engineering are both considered to be sufficiently broad and complex that separate degrees are offered.

Some electrical engineers choose to study for a postgraduate degree such as a Master of Engineering/Master of Science (MEng/MSc), a Master of Engineering Management, a Doctor of Philosophy (PhD) in Engineering, an Engineering Doctorate (Eng.D.), or an Engineer's degree. The master's and engineer's degrees may consist of either research, coursework or a mixture of the two. The Doctor of Philosophy and Engineering Doctorate degrees consist of a significant research component and are often viewed as the entry point to academia. In the United Kingdom and some other European countries, Master of Engineering is often considered to be an undergraduate degree of slightly longer duration than the Bachelor of Engineering, rather than a standalone postgraduate degree.

== Professional practice ==
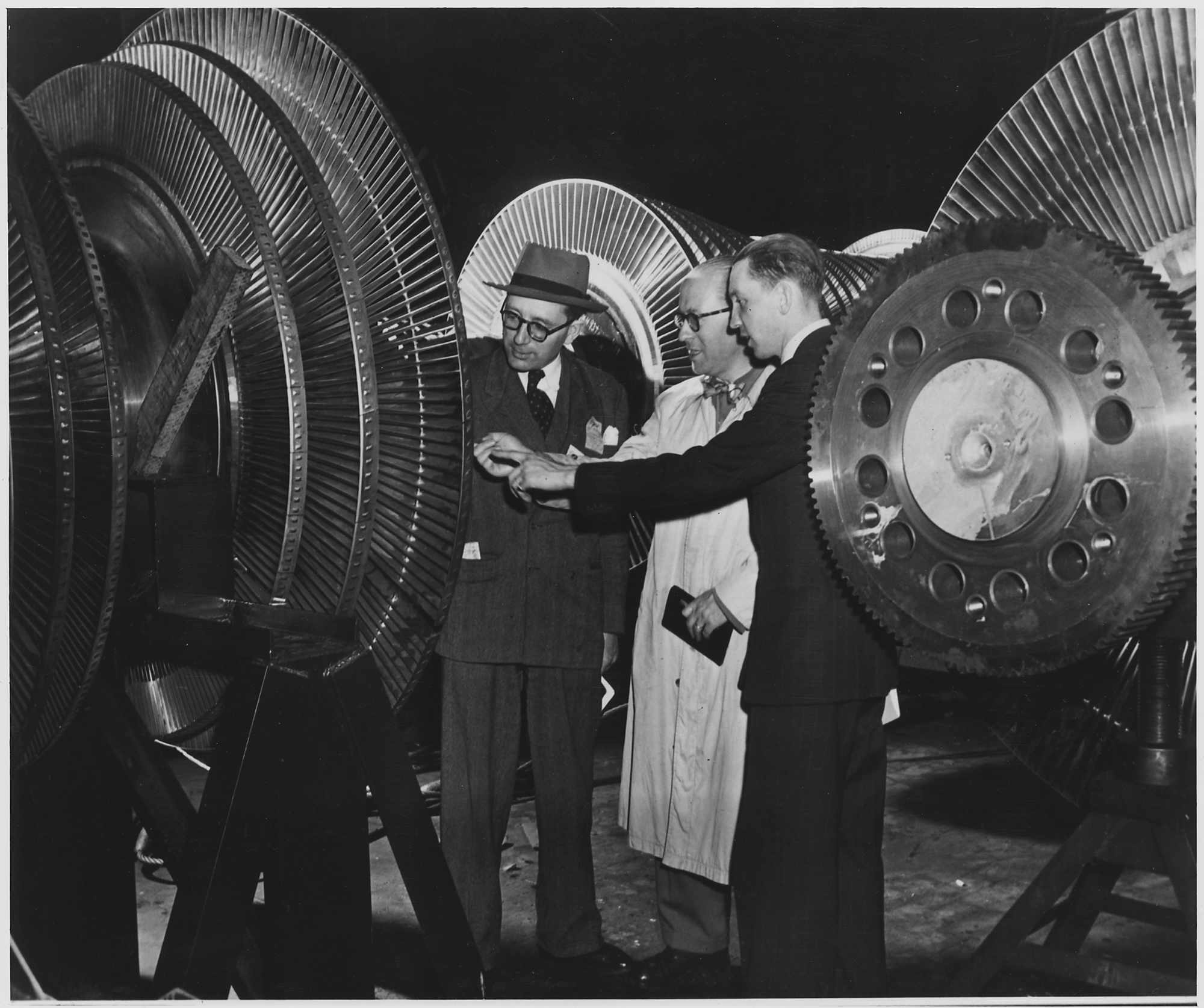
Belgian electrical engineers inspecting the rotor of a 40,000 kilowatt turbine of the General Electric Company in New York City

In most countries, a bachelor's degree in engineering represents the first step towards professional certification and the degree program itself is certified by a professional body. After completing a certified degree program the engineer must satisfy a range of requirements (including work experience requirements) before being certified. Once certified the engineer is designated the title of Professional Engineer (in the United States, Canada and South Africa), Chartered engineer or Incorporated Engineer (in India, Pakistan, the United Kingdom, Ireland and Zimbabwe), Chartered Professional Engineer (in Australia and New Zealand) or European Engineer (in much of the European Union).

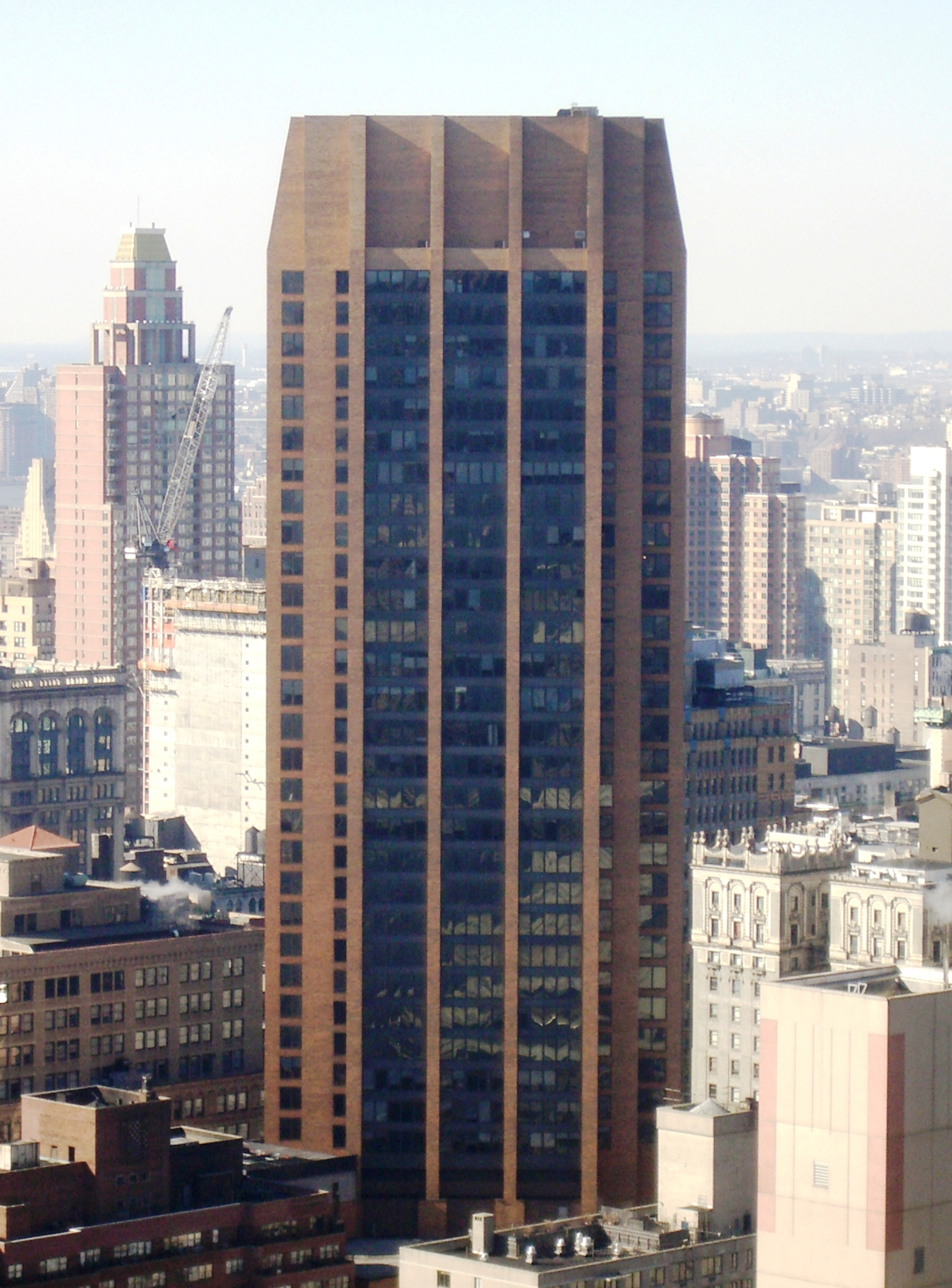
The IEEE corporate office is on the 17th floor of 3 Park Avenue in New York City.

The advantages of licensure vary depending on location. For example, in the United States and Canada, "only a licensed engineer may seal engineering work for public and private clients". This requirement is enforced by state and provincial legislation such as Quebec's Engineers Act. In other countries, no such legislation exists. Practically all certifying bodies maintain a code of ethics that they expect all members to abide by or risk expulsion. In this way these organizations play an important role in maintaining ethical standards for the profession. Even in jurisdictions where certification has little or no legal bearing on work, engineers are subject to contract law. In cases where an engineer's work fails he or she may be subject to the tort of negligence and, in extreme cases, the charge of criminal negligence. An engineer's work must also comply with numerous other rules and regulations, such as building codes and legislation pertaining to environmental law.

Professional bodies of note for electrical engineers include the Institute of Electrical and Electronics Engineers (IEEE) and the Institution of Engineering and Technology (IET). The IEEE, which claims to produce 30% of the world's literature in electrical engineering, has over 360,000 members worldwide and holds over 3,000 conferences annually. The IET publishes 21 journals, has a worldwide membership of over 150,000, and claims to be the largest professional engineering society in Europe. Obsolescence of technical skills is a serious concern for electrical engineers. Membership and participation in technical societies, regular reviews of periodicals in the field and a habit of continued learning are therefore essential to maintaining proficiency. An MIET(Member of the Institution of Engineering and Technology) is recognised in Europe as an Electrical and computer (technology) engineer.

In Australia, Canada, and the United States, electrical engineers make up around 0.25% of the labor force. (Note: In May 2014 there were around 175,000 people working as electrical engineers in the US. In 2012, Australia had around 19,000 while in Canada, there were around 37,000 (as of 2007), constituting about 0.2% of the labour force in each of the three countries. Australia and Canada reported that 96% and 88% of their electrical engineers respectively are male.)

== Tools and work ==
From the Global Positioning System to electric power generation, electrical engineers have contributed to the development of a wide range of technologies. They design, develop, test, and supervise the deployment of electrical systems and electronic devices. For example, they may work on the design of telecommunications systems, the operation of electric power stations, the lighting and wiring of buildings, the design of household appliances, or the electrical control of industrial machinery.

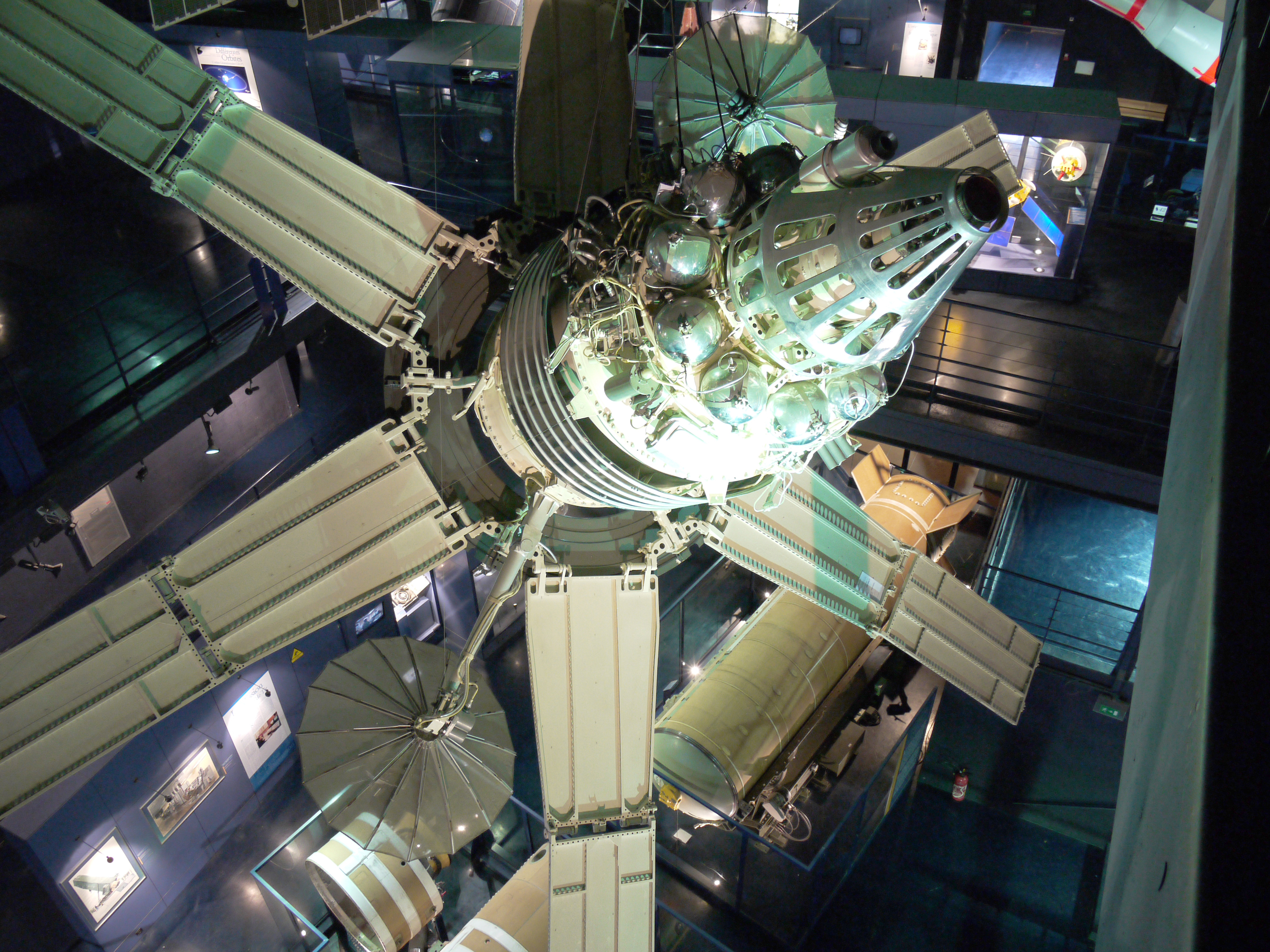
Satellite communications is typical of what electrical engineers work on.

Fundamental to the discipline are the sciences of physics and mathematics, as these help to obtain both a qualitative and quantitative description of how such systems will work. Today, most engineering work involves the use of computers, and it is commonplace to use computer-aided design programs when designing electrical systems. Nevertheless, the ability to sketch ideas is still invaluable for quickly communicating with others.

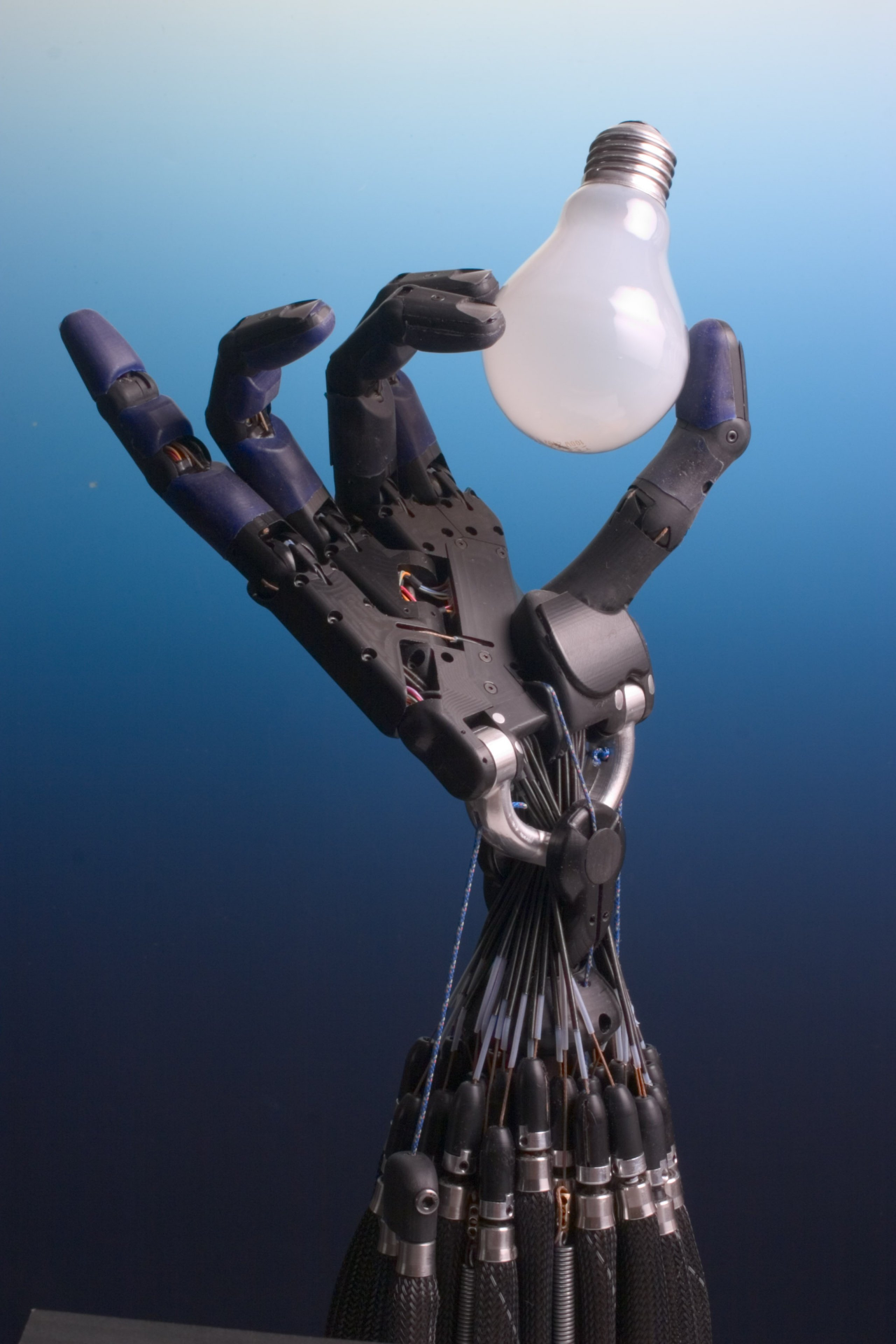
The Shadow robot hand system

Although most electrical engineers will understand basic circuit theory (that is, the interactions of elements such as resistors, capacitors, diodes, transistors, and inductors in a circuit), the theories employed by engineers generally depend upon the work they do. For example, quantum mechanics and solid state physics might be relevant to an engineer working on VLSI (the design of integrated circuits), but are largely irrelevant to engineers working with macroscopic electrical systems. Even circuit theory may not be relevant to a person designing telecommunications systems that use off-the-shelf components. Perhaps the most important technical skills for electrical engineers are reflected in university programs, which emphasize strong numerical skills, computer literacy, and the ability to understand the technical language and concepts that relate to electrical engineering.

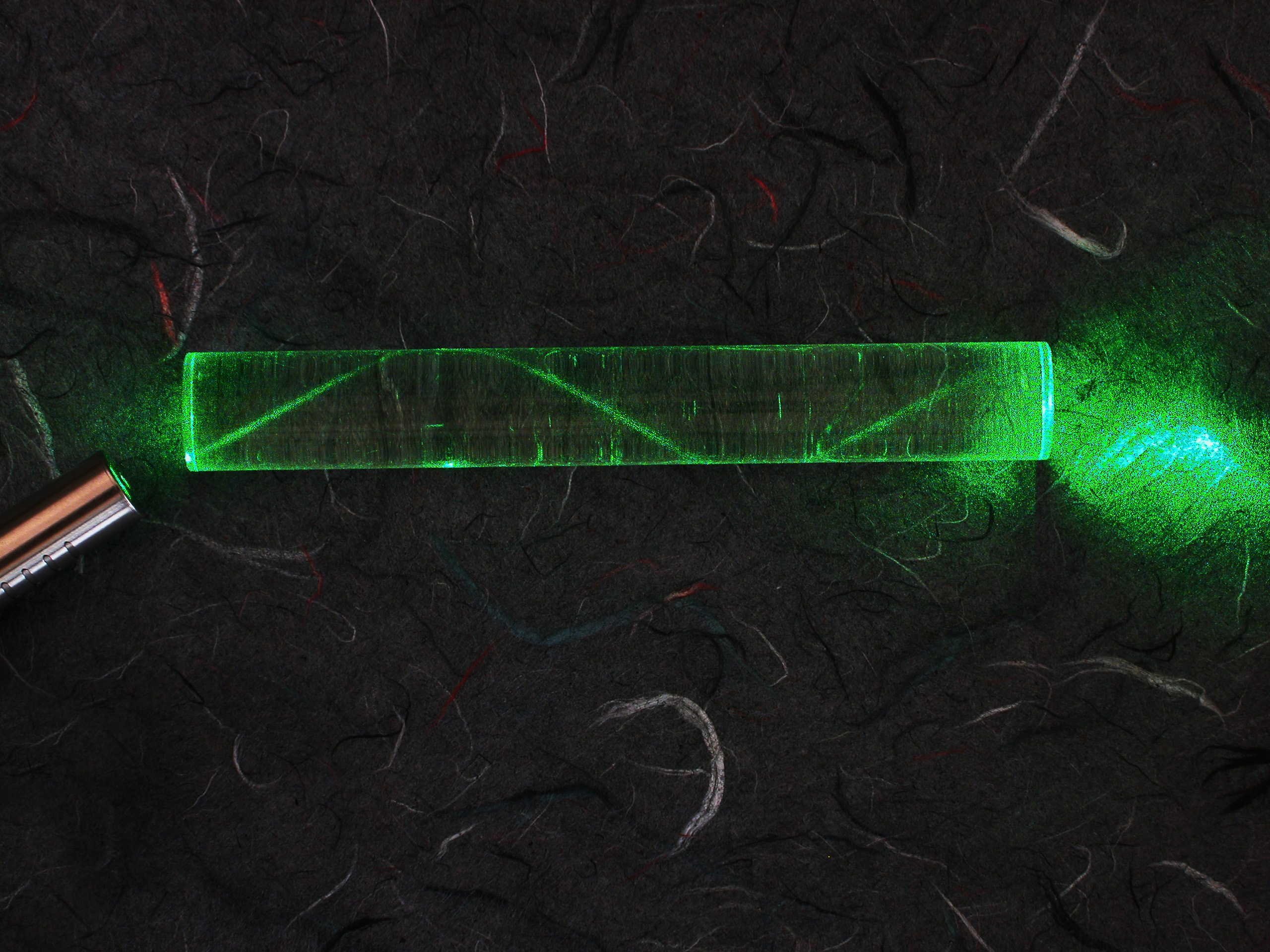
A laser bouncing down an acrylic rod, illustrating the total internal reflection of light in a multi-mode optical fiber

A wide range of instrumentation is used by electrical engineers. For simple control circuits and alarms, a basic multimeter measuring voltage, current, and resistance may suffice. Where time-varying signals need to be studied, the oscilloscope is also an ubiquitous instrument. In RF engineering and high-frequency telecommunications, spectrum analyzers and network analyzers are used. In some disciplines, safety can be a particular concern with instrumentation. For instance, medical electronics designers must take into account that much lower voltages than normal can be dangerous when electrodes are directly in contact with internal body fluids. Power transmission engineering also has great safety concerns due to the high voltages used; although voltmeters may in principle be similar to their low voltage equivalents, safety and calibration issues make them very different. Many disciplines of electrical engineering use tests specific to their discipline. Audio electronics engineers use audio test sets consisting of a signal generator and a meter, principally to measure level but also other parameters such as harmonic distortion and noise. Likewise, information technology has its own test sets, often specific to a particular data format, and the same is true of television broadcasting.

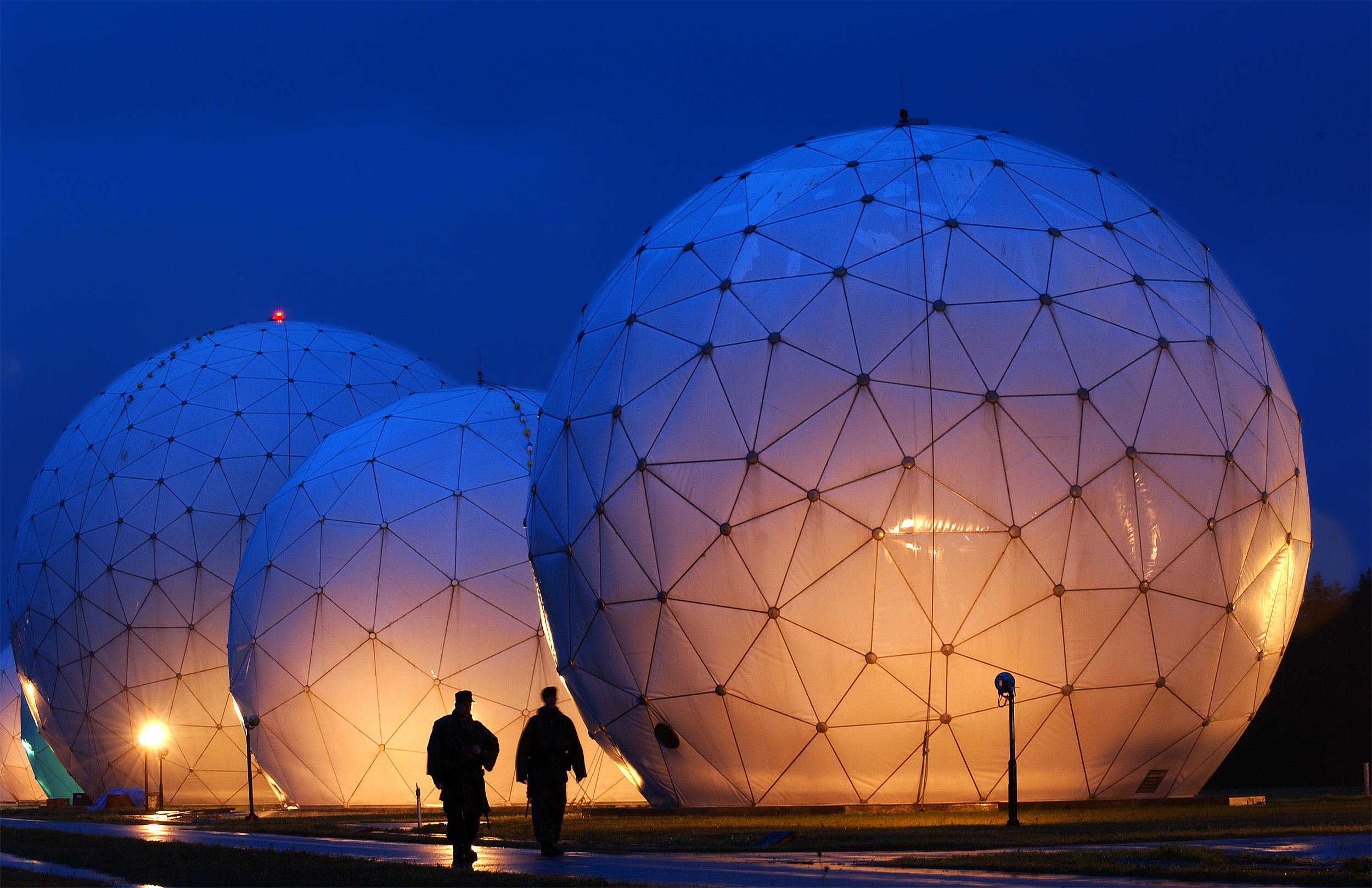
Radome at the Misawa Air Base Misawa Security Operations Center, Misawa, Japan

For many engineers, technical work accounts for only a fraction of the work they do. A lot of time may also be spent on tasks such as discussing proposals with clients, preparing budgets and determining project schedules. Many senior engineers manage a team of technicians or other engineers and for this reason project management skills are important. Most engineering projects involve some form of documentation and strong written communication skills are therefore very important.

The workplaces of engineers are just as varied as the types of work they do. Electrical engineers may be found in the pristine lab environment of a fabrication plant, on board a Naval ship, the offices of a consulting firm or on site at a mine. During their working life, electrical engineers may find themselves supervising a wide range of individuals, including scientists, electricians, computer programmers, and other engineers.

Electrical engineering has an intimate relationship with the physical sciences. For instance, the physicist Lord Kelvin played a major role in the engineering of the first transatlantic telegraph cable. Conversely, the engineer Oliver Heaviside produced major work on the mathematics of transmission on telegraph cables. Electrical engineers are often required on major science projects. For instance, large particle accelerators such as CERN need electrical engineers to deal with many aspects of the project including the power distribution, the instrumentation, and the manufacture and installation of the superconducting electromagnets.

== See also ==
- Barnacle (slang)
- Comparison of EDA software
- Electrical Technologist
- Electronic design automation
- Glossary of electrical and electronics engineering
- Index of electrical engineering articles
- Information engineering
- International Electrotechnical Commission (IEC)
- List of electrical engineers
- List of electrical engineering journals
- List of engineering branches
- List of mechanical, electrical and electronic equipment manufacturing companies by revenue
- List of Russian electrical engineers
- Occupations in electrical/electronics engineering
- Outline of electrical engineering
- Timeline of electrical and electronic engineering
