= Index of electrical engineering articles =

This is an alphabetical list of articles pertaining specifically to electrical and electronics engineering. For a thematic list, please see List of electrical engineering topics. For a broad overview of engineering, see List of engineering topics. For biographies, see List of engineers.

== # ==
- 866A
- 15 kV AC
- 2D computer graphics
- 3Com

== A ==
- Abrasion (mechanical)
- AC adapter
- AC power plugs and sockets
- AC power
- AC/AC converter
- AC/DC receiver design
- AC/DC conversion
- Active rectification
- Actuator
- Adaptive control
- Adjustable-speed drive
- Advanced Z-transform
- Affinity law
- Agbioeletric
- AIEE
- All American Five
- Alloy
- ALOHAnet
- Alpha–beta transformation
- Altair 8800
- Alternating current
- Alternator (auto)
- Alternator synchronization--
- Alternator
- Altitude
- Aluminium smelting
- AIEE
- Ammeter
- Amorphous metal transformer
- Ampacity
- Ampere
- Ampère's circuital law
- Ampère's force law
- Ampère's law
- Amplidyne
- Amplifier
- Amplitude modulation
- Analog circuit
- Analog filter
- Analog signal processing
- Analog signal
- Analog-to-digital converter
- Annealing (metallurgy)
- Anode
- Antenna (radio)
- Apollo program
- Apparent power
- Apple Computer
- Arc converter
- Arc furnace
- Arc lamp
- Arc welder
- Argon
- Arithmetic mean
- Armature (electrical engineering)
- Artificial heart
- Artificial intelligence
- Artificial neural networks
- Artificial pacemaker
- ASTM
- Asymptotic stability
- Asynchronous circuit
- Audio and video connector
- Audio equipment
- Audio filter
- Audio frequency
- Audio noise reduction
- Audio signal processing
- Audion tube
- Austin transformer
- Automatic gain control
- Automatic transfer switch
- Automation
- Autorecloser
- Autotransformer
- Availability factor
- Avalanche diode
- Average rectified value

== B ==
- Backward-wave oscillator
- Balanced line
- Ball bearing motor
- Balun
- Band-pass filter
- Band-stop filter
- Bandwidth (signal processing)
- Bang–bang control
- Barlow's wheel
- Bartlett's bisection theorem
- Base-load power plant
- Battery (electricity)
- Battery eliminator
- Bayer filter
- Beam tetrode
- Beat frequency
- Beckman Instruments
- Bell Telephone Laboratories
- Biasing
- BIBO stability
- Bilinear transform
- Bimetallic strip
- Biofuel
- Biomass
- Biomedical engineering
- Biot–Savart law
- Bipolar junction transistor
- Bipolar transistor
- Black start
- Blocked rotor test
- Blu-ray Disc
- Bode plot
- Boolean algebra (logic)
- Boolean algebra (structure)
- Boost converter
- Booster (electric power)
- Bound charge
- Braking chopper
- Branch circuit
- Breakdown voltage
- Bridge rectifier
- Broadcasting
- Brown, Boveri & Cie
- Brush (electric)
- Brushed DC electric motor
- Brushless DC electric motor
- Buchholz relay
- Buck converter
- Buck–boost converter
- Buck–boost transformer
- Building codes
- Bulb
- Bunker Ramo Corporation
- Busbar
- Bushing (electrical)
- Butterworth filter
- Buzzer

== C ==
- Cable
- Cadmium
- Calculus
- Canadian electrical code
- Canadian Standards Association
- Capacitance
- Capacitor voltage transformer
- Capacitor
- Capacitor-input filter
- Capacitors
- Capacity factor
- Carbon offset
- Carrier current
- Carrier wave
- Category 3 cable
- Category 5e cable
- Category 5e
- Category 6 cable
- Catenary
- Cathode ray oscilloscope
- Cathode-ray tube
- Cathode
- Cat's-whisker detector
- CATV
- Cavity magnetron
- magnetron
- CD
- Cegelec
- Cell energy
- Center tap
- Ceramic resonator
- Charactron
- Charge pump
- Charge transfer switch
- Charge-coupled device
- CHAYKA
- Chebyshev filter
- Chemistry
- Choke (electronics)
- Chopper (electronics)
- Circle diagram
- Circuit breaker panel
- Circuit breaker
- Circuit theory
- Circuit Total Limitation (CTL)
- Clamp meter
- Clapp oscillator
- Class of accuracy in electrical measurements
- Closed-loop controller
- Coal
- Coax cable
- Coaxial cable
- Cochlear implant
- Cockcroft–Walton generator
- Cogeneration
- Cold cathode
- Cold work
- Colossus (computer)
- Combined cycle
- Commercial off-the-shelf
- Communication channel
- Communication system
- Communications satellite
- Communications server
- Commutation cell
- Commutator (electric)
- Compact fluorescent lamp
- Compactron
- Compensation winding
- Complex conjugate
- Complex number
- Complex systems
- Computational biology
- Computational Intelligence
- Computed tomography
- Computer engineering
- Computer hardware
- Computer literacy
- Computer programming
- Computer science
- Computer system
- Computer
- Computer-aided design
- Computers
- Concentric
- Conduction band
- Constant k filter
- Constitutive equation
- Consumer electronics
- Contactor
- Continuous Fourier transform
- Continuous signal
- Control engineering
- Control systems
- Control theory
- Controllability
- Controller (control theory)
- Cooling tower
- Copper cable certification
- Copper loss
- Copper(I) oxide
- Copper
- Copper-clad aluminum
- Copper-clad steel
- Cornell University
- Corona ring
- Corrosion
- Coulomb
- Coulomb's law
- CPU
- Creep (deformation)
- Crest factor
- Crossed-field amplifier
- Crosstalk
- Cruise control
- Crystal oscillator
- Ćuk converter
- Current (electricity)
- Current density
- Current division
- Current source inverter
- Current source
- Current transformer
- Current-to-voltage converter
- Cybernetics
- Cyber-physical system
- Cycloconverter
- Cylinder (geometry)

== D ==
- Damping ratio
- Darlington transistor
- Darmstadt University of Technology
- Data compression
- Data networks
- DC injection braking
- DC-to-DC converter
- Decision tree
- Deformation (mechanics)
- Delay line (disambiguation)
- Delco Electronics
- Delta-wye transformer
- Demand factor
- Demand response
- Demodulation
- Describing function
- Design
- Desktop computer
- Detector (radio)
- DIAC
- Dielectric
- Differential (mathematics)
- Digital audio broadcasting
- Digital circuit
- Digital computers
- Digital control
- Digital Equipment Corporation
- Digital filter
- Digital image processing
- Digital micromirror device
- Digital protective relay
- Digital signal controller
- Digital signal processing
- Digital television
- Digital-to-analog converter
- Diode bridge
- Diode
- Direct current
- Direct on line starter--
- Direct torque control
- Discrete cosine transform
- Discrete Fourier transform
- Discrete signal
- Displacement current
- Display device
- Dissipation
- Dissolved gas analysis
- Distributed control system
- Distributed-element model
- Distributed generation
- Distribution board
- Distribution transformer
- Dolby
- Dot convention
- Doubly fed electric machine
- Downsampling
- Dqo transformation
- Droop speed control
- Dual control theory
- Dual loop
- Ductility
- DVD player
- DVD
- Dynamic braking
- Dynamic demand (electric power)
- Dynamic programming
- Dynamic random-access memory
- Dynamic system
- Dynamo

== E ==
- Earth-leakage circuit breaker
- Earth potential rise
- Earth
- Earthing system
- Ebers-Moll
- Ecotax
- Eddy current
- Edge detection
- Edison effect
- Edison Pioneer
- Eigenvalues and eigenvectors
- Electret
- Electric arc
- Electric charge
- Electric circuit
- Electric current
- Electric displacement field
- Electric distribution systems
- Electric field gradient
- Electric field
- Electric generator
- Electric motor
- Electric multiple unit
- Electric potential
- Electric power conversion
- Electric power distribution
- Electric Power Research Institute
- Electric power transmission
- Electric power
- Electric shock
- Electrical circuit
- Electrical code
- Electrical conductivity
- Electrical conductor
- Electrical contact
- Electrical discharge machining (EDM)
- Electrical element
- Electrical engineering
- Electrical equipment
- Electrical generator
- Electrical grid
- Electrical impedance
- Electrical insulation paper
- Electrical insulation
- Electrical load
- Electrical machine
- Electrical measurements
- Electrical network
- Electrical polarity
- Electrical power transmission
- Electrical resistance
- Electrical steel
- Electrical substation
- Electrical Technologist
- Electrical wiring in Hong Kong
- Electrical wiring in North America
- Electrical wiring in the United Kingdom
- Electrical wiring regulations
- Electrical wiring
- Electricity distribution
- Electricity generation
- Electricity meter
- Electricity pylon
- Electricity
- Electrification
- Electroactive polymers
- Electrocardiograph
- Electrochemical engineering
- Electrodes
- Electro-diesel locomotive
- Electrodynamics
- Electrolytic
- Electromagnet
- Electromagnetic compatibility
- Electromagnetic field
- Electromagnetic induction
- Electromagnetic radiation
- Electromagnetic spectrum
- Electromagnetic wave equation
- Electromagnetism
- Electromechanical
- Electro-mechanical
- Electromote
- Electromotive force
- Electron microscope
- Electronic amplifier
- Electronic circuit
- Electronic component
- Electronic Control Unit
- Electronic design automation
- Electronic engineering
- Electronic filter
- Electronic speed control
- Electronics
- Electrophorus
- Electrostatic motor
- Electrostatics
- Embedded operating system
- Embedded software
- Embedded system
- Enameled wire
- Energy demand management
- Energy economics
- Energy efficient transformer
- Energy returned on energy invested
- Energy subsidies
- Engineering economics
- Engineering education
- Engineering ethics
- Engineering management
- Engineering society
- Engineering
- Engine-generator
- ENIAC
- Environmental engineering
- Epstein frame
- Equalization (audio)
- Equalization (communications)
- Equivalent circuit
- Equivalent impedance transforms
- Error correction and detection
- Error correction
- Error detection
- Ethernet
- Ethical code
- Euclidean geometry
- Euler–Lagrange equation
- Euler's formula
- Euler's identity
- Exponential stability
- Extended Kalman filter
- External electric load

== F ==
- Fairchild Semiconductor
- Farad
- Faraday shield
- Faraday–Lenz law
- Faraday's law of induction
- Fast Fourier transform
- Fault (power engineering)
- Fax
- Feed forward (control)
- Feedback amplifier
- Feedback
- Feed-in tariff
- Ferranti
- Ferrite core
- Ferroelectricity
- Fiber-optic cable
- Fiber optic
- Field-effect transistor
- Field-oriented control
- Fields of engineering
- Filter (signal processing)
- Filter capacitor
- Finite impulse response
- Firmware
- First principles
- Fleming valve
- Fleming's left-hand rule for motors
- Flight instruments
- Fluorescent lamp
- Fluorinated ethylene propylene
- Flux linkage
- Flyback converter
- Flyback transformer
- Fokker–Planck equation
- Forward converter
- Fossil-fuel phase-out--
- Fossil-fuel power station--
- Fourier series
- Fourier transform
- FPGA
- Free-space optical communications
- Frequency changer
- Frequency modulation
- Frequency response
- Frequency
- Full load current
- Full-wave rectifier
- Fundamentals of Engineering exam
- Fuse (electrical)
- Fuzzy control

== G ==
- Gain scheduling
- Galvanic corrosion
- Galvanometer
- Gas-filled tube
- Gate turn-off thyristor (GTO)
- Gauss's law
- Gauss–Seidel method
- General Electric Company plc
- General Electric
- General Radio Corporation
- Generator (circuit theory)
- Geographic information systems
- Georgia School of Technology
- Geoscience
- Geothermal power
- Germanium
- Gigabit
- Global Positioning System
- Gold
- Governor (device)
- GPS
- Gradient descent
- Grid energy storage
- Grid-tie inverter
- Ground (electricity)
- Ground and neutral
- Ground-level power supply
- Growler (electrical device)
- GSM
- Gunn diode
- Gyrotron

== H ==
- H infinity
- Hall-effect sensor
- Harmonic distortion
- Harmonic oscillator
- Harmonic
- Harmonics (electrical power)
- H-bridge
- HDTV
- Headphone
- Heat transfer
- Heatsink
- Heaviside step function
- Henry (unit)
- Hertz
- Heterostructure
- Hewlett-Packard
- Hi-Fi
- High-voltage cable
- High voltage
- High-pass filter
- High-voltage direct current
- High-voltage switchgear
- Hilbert transform
- History of electrical engineering
- Holography
- Home appliance
- Homopolar generator
- Homopolar motor
- Horsepower
- Hot wire barretter
- Hradec substation
- Hughes Aircraft
- Humidistat
- HVAC
- HVDC converter station
- HVDC
- Hybrid coil
- Hybrid electric vehicle
- Hybrid Synergy Drive
- Hydroelectricity
- Hydrogen embrittlement
- Hydropower
- Hydro-Québec's electricity transmission system
- Hysteresis

== I ==
- Idaho National Laboratory
- IEC61850
- IEEE Aerospace and Electronic Systems Society
- IEEE Antennas and Propagation Society
- IEEE Broadcast Technology Society
- IEEE Circuits and Systems Society
- IEEE Communications Society
- IEEE Dielectrics & Electrical Insulation Society
- IEEE Electromagnetic Compatibility Society
- IEEE Electron Devices Society
- IEEE Engineering in Medicine and Biology Society
- IEEE Geoscience and Remote Sensing Society
- IEEE Industrial Electronics Society
- IEEE Industry Applications Society
- IEEE Information Theory Society
- IEEE Instrumentation & Measurement Society
- IEEE Intelligent Transportation Systems Society
- IEEE Magnetics Society
- IEEE Microwave Theory and Techniques Society
- IEEE Nuclear and Plasma Sciences Society
- IEEE Oceanic Engineering Society
- IEEE Photonics Society
- IEEE Power & Energy Society
- IEEE Reliability Society
- IEEE Robotics and Automation Society
- IEEE Signal Processing Society
- IEEE Society on Social Implications of Technology
- IEEE Solid-State Circuits Society
- IEEE Systems, Man, and Cybernetics Society
- IEEE Ultrasonics, Ferroelectrics, and Frequency Control Society
- IEEE Vehicular Technology Society
- IEEE Xplore
- IGBT
- Image impedance
- Image noise reduction
- Image processing
- Impulse response
- Incandescent lamp
- Incandescent light bulb
- Inchworm motor—
- Inductance
- Induction coil
- induction cooker
- Induction generator
- Induction motor
- Induction regulator
- Inductive coupling
- Inductive output tube
- Inductor
- Inductors
- Industrial and multiphase power plugs and sockets
- Industrial automation
- Industrial Control Systems
- Infinite impulse response
- Information appliance
- Information communication technology
- Information Theory
- Information
- Inga–Shaba
- Input/output
- Inrush current
- Institute of Electrical and Electronics Engineers (IEEE)
- Institution of Electrical Engineers
- Institution of Engineering and Technology
- Instrumentation engineering
- Instrumentation
- Insulation monitoring device
- Insulator (electrical)
- Integrated circuit
- Intel 4004
- Intel 8080
- Intel Corporation
- Intel
- Intelligent control
- Intelligent Transportation System
- Intermittent energy source
- Internal combustion engine
- International Electrotechnical Commission (IEC)
- International Organization for Standardization
- Interrupter
- Invention of radio
- Inverter (electrical)
- Iron loss
- Isolated-phase bus
- Isolation transformer
- Iterative learning control

== J ==
- j operator –
- Jacobi method
- Jedlik's dynamo
- JFET
- Joule heating
- Joule

== K ==
- Kalman filter
- Kalman–Yakubovich–Popov lemma
- Kelvin–Stokes theorem
- Kilovolt-ampere
- Kirchhoff's circuit laws
- Klystron
- Kolmogorov backward equation

== L ==
- Lacquer
- LAN
- Laplace transform
- Laser diode
- Leakage inductance
- Least squares
- Light-emitting diode
- Line integral
- Linear alternator
- linear differential equation
- Linear matrix inequality
- Linear motor
- Linear transformation in rotating electrical machines
- Linear variable differential transformer
- linear
- Lineman (occupation)
- List of calculus topics
- List of chemistry topics
- List of railway electrification systems
- List of electrical engineering topics
- List of electrical engineers
- List of electronics topics
- List of mathematical topics
- List of people in systems and control
- List of physics topics
- List of Russian electrical engineers
- Litz wire
- Load flow study
- Load following power plant
- Load-loss factor
- Load management
- Load profile
- Local positioning system
- LORAN
- Lorentz force law
- Loss power
- Lossless data compression
- Lossy data compression
- Loudspeaker
- Low-pass filter
- LTI system theory
- Lumen (unit)
- Lumped parameters
- Lyapunov stability
- Lynch motor

== M ==
- Macroscopic
- Machine learning --
- Magnet wire
- Magnet
- Magnetic blowout
- Magnetic circuit
- Magnetic constant
- Magnetic core
- Magnetic-core memory
- Magnetic field
- Magnetic flux density
- Magnetic flux
- Magnetic moment
- Magnetics
- Magnetism
- Magnetization
- Magnetization current
- Magnetostatics
- Magnetostriction
- Magnifying transmitter
- Main distribution frame
- Mainframe computer
- Mains electricity
- Mains hum
- Mains power systems
- Manitoba Hydro
- Manufacturing engineering
- Marginal stability
- Marine energy
- Marx generator
- Maser
- Massachusetts Institute of Technology
- Mathematical model
- Mathematics
- Matrix (mathematics)
- Maximum prospective short-circuit current
- Maxwell equations
- Maxwell's equations
- Mead and Conway revolution
- Mean free path
- Measurement
- Mechanical rectifier
- Mechatronics
- Medical equipment
- Memistor
- Mendocino motor
- Mercury-arc rectifier
- Mercury-arc valve
- Mercury-vapor lamp
- Mesh analysis
- Mesh networking
- Mesh
- Metadyne
- Metal detector
- Metal rectifier
- Metalworking
- Micro combined heat and power
- Microcontroller
- Microelectromechanical systems
- Microelectronics
- Microfabrication
- Microgeneration
- Microphone
- Microprocessor
- Microprocessors
- Microwave oven
- Microwave radio
- Microwave
- Millman's theorem
- Mineral-insulated copper-clad cable
- Mobile phone
- Modbus
- Model predictive control
- Modem
- Modulation transformer
- Modulation
- Monoscope
- Moon landing
- Moore's law
- Morse code
- MOSFET
- Motion control
- Motor controller
- Motor soft starter
- Mp3
- MRI
- Multics
- Multimeter
- Multisim

== N ==
- Nameplate capacity
- Nanoengineering
- Nanomotor
- Nanotechnology
- National Electrical Code
- National Electrical Manufacturers Association (NEMA)
- Natural gas
- Negative feedback
- Negative resistance
- Negawatt power
- Nelson River Bipole
- Neodymium magnets
- Neon sign
- Neon-sign transformer
- Net metering
- Network analyzer (AC power)--
- Network cable
- Network protector
- Newcastle-upon-Tyne Electric Supply Company
- Niagara Falls
- Nodal analysis
- Node (circuits)
- Noise cancelling
- Noise reduction
- Nominal impedance
- Nonlinear control
- Nonode
- Norton theorem
- Norton's theorem
- Notch filter
- NTSC
- Nuclear power
- Numerical control
- Nuvistor
- Nyquist frequency
- Nyquist stability criterion
- Nyquist–Shannon sampling theorem

== O ==
- Observability
- Occupations in electrical/electronics engineering
- Ohm
- Ohmmeter
- Ohm's law
- Oil shale
- One-line diagram
- On-premises wiring
- Open-circuit test
- Open-circuit voltage
- Open-circuit time constant method
- Open-circuit voltage
- Operational amplifier
- Optical fiber
- Optimal control
- Oscillation
- Oscilloscope
- Oudin coil
- Out of phase
- Outline of electrical engineering
- Overhead line
- Oversampling
- Overshoot (signal)
- Overvoltage
- Oxidation
- Oxygen
- Oxygen-free copper

== P ==
- Pad-mounted transformer
- Pantograph (rail)
- Paraformer
- Parameter estimation
- Park transform
- Park's transformation
- Partial discharge
- Passivity (engineering)
- Patch cables
- Peak demand
- Pearl Street Station
- Peltier–Seebeck effect
- Pentagrid converter
- Pentode
- Permanent magnet synchronous generator
- Permanent magnet
- Permeability (electromagnetism)
- Personal computer
- Personal digital assistant
- Perturbation theory
- Petroleum
- pH meter
- Phase (waves)
- Phase converter
- Phase-fired controllers
- Phase-locked loop
- Phase modulation
- Phasor
- Phasor measurement unit
- Phasor
- Phonograph
- Photocell
- Photodetector
- Photodiode
- Photometer
- Photonics
- Photoresistor
- Phototransistor
- Physics
- Physis
- PID controller
- Piezoelectric effect
- Piezoelectric motor
- Pigovian tax
- PIN diode
- Pirelli
- Planar graph
- Plasma (physics)
- Plenum cable
- Plug-in hybrid
- p–n junction
- Polarization density
- Polyethylene
- Polymer
- Polyphase coil
- Polyphase system
- Polypropylene
- Polytetrafluoroethylene
- Pontryagin's minimum principle
- Port (circuit theory)
- Positive feedback
- Potential difference
- Potentiometer
- Potentiometers
- Power
- Power BJT
- Power cable
- Power conditioner
- Power consumption
- Power converter
- Power electronics
- Power engineering
- Power-factor correction
- Power factor
- Power-flow study
- Power generation
- Power grid
- Power inverter
- Power inverter
- Power-line carrier communication
- Power-line communication
- Power MOSFET
- Power plant
- Power rating
- Power quality
- Power station
- Power storage
- Power supplies
- Power-system automation
- Power-system protection
- Precious metal
- Pressure
- Printed circuit board
- Printer (computing)
- Process control
- Product lifecycle management
- Product safety
- Professional communication
- Professional engineer
- Programmable logic controller
- Programming language
- Project management
- Projection (mathematics)
- Prolec GE
- Protective relay
- Proximity effect (electromagnetism)
- Pulse transformer
- Pulse-width modulation
- Pulse-amplitude modulation (PAM)
- Pulse-code modulation
- Pumped-storage hydroelectricity
- Push switch
- Push–pull converter

== Q ==
- Quadrature booster
- Qualitative data
- Quality
- Quality control
- Quality factor
- Quantity
- Quantization (signal processing)

== R ==
- Radar cross-section
- Radar
- Radio frequency
- Radio transmitter
- Radio
- Railroad
- Railway electrification system
- Rankine cycle
- Rapid transit
- Reactive power
- Real-time operating system
- Receiver (radio)
- Rechargeable battery
- Reciprocity (electromagnetism)
- Record player
- Rectifier
- Rectiformer
- Recursive least squares
- Reed switch
- Regenerative braking
- Regenerative circuit
- Reis telephone
- Relaxation oscillator
- Relay
- Reliability engineering
- Reluctance motor
- Remanence
- Remote racking system
- Remote Sensing
- Renewable electricity
- Renewable Energy Certificates
- Renewable energy payments
- Renewable energy policy
- Repeating coil
- Repowering
- Repulsion motor
- Resettable fuse
- Residual-current circuit breaker
- Resistive circuit
- Resistivity
- Resistor
- Resistors
- Resolver (electrical)
- Resonant cavity
- Resonant inductive coupling
- Reverse engineering
- RF connector
- RF engineering
- RG-6
- Rheoscope
- Rheostat
- Right hand grip rule
- Ripple (electrical)
- RLC circuit
- Robotics
- Robust control
- Rogowski coil
- Root locus
- Root mean square
- Rotary converter
- Rotary encoder
- Rotary switch
- Rotary transformer
- Rotary variable differential transformer
- Rotation (mathematics)
- Rotor (electric)
- Routh–Hurwitz stability criterion
- Routh–Hurwitz theorem

== S ==
- Sallen–Key filter
- Sample and hold
- Sampling (signal processing)
- Sampling frequency
- Satellite radio
- Satellite
- Saturation (magnetic)
- SCADA
- Schmitt trigger
- Schottky diode
- Scott-T transformer
- s-domain
- SDTV
- Segmentation (image processing)
- Selenium rectifiers
- Semiconductor device
- Semiconductor fabrication
- Semiconductor
- Sensor
- Serial communication
- Series and parallel circuits
- SETI
- Shaded-pole motor
- Shaft voltage
- Shielded twisted pair
- Short-circuit test
- Short circuit
- Shunt (electrical)
- SI
- Siemens & Halske
- Siemens (unit)
- Siemens
- Signal (electrical engineering)
- Signal (information theory)
- Signal noise
- Signal processing
- Signal strength
- Signal-flow graph
- Signal-to-noise ratio
- Silicon controlled rectifier
- Silicon Valley
- Silicon
- Silver
- Sine wave
- Single-phase electric power
- Single-phase
- Single-sideband modulation
- Skin effect
- Sliding mode control
- Slip ring
- Small-signal model
- Smart grid
- Smith chart
- Snowy Mountains scheme
- Software engineering
- Software
- Solar cell
- Solar energy
- Solar micro-inverter
- Solar power plants in the Mojave Desert
- Solar power
- Soldering
- Solenoid
- Solid state (electronics)
- Solid state physics
- Solid-state circuit
- Sound recording
- Space flight
- Space vector modulation
- Spark spread
- Spark-gap transmitter
- Spectrum analyzer
- Speech processing
- SPICE
- Split phase
- Square wave
- Stability theory
- Stable polynomial
- Stacking factor
- Star-mesh transform
- State observer
- State-space representation
- Static VAR compensator
- Stator
- Steady-state
- Steam turbine
- Steel
- Step response
- Stepper motor
- Stereophonic sound
- Stokes' theorem
- Storage tube
- Stray capacitance
- Structure gauge
- Structured cabling
- Submarine communications cable
- Sulfur hexafluoride circuit breaker
- Sulfur hexafluoride
- Sun Microsystems
- Super grid
- Supercomputer
- Superconducting electric machine
- Superconductivity
- Superfluid
- Superheterodyne receiver
- Superposition theorem
- Surge arrester
- Surge protection
- Switch
- Switched reluctance motor
- Switched-mode power supply
- Switchgear
- Symbolic circuit analysis
- Symmetrical components
- Synchro
- Synchronization (alternating current)
- Synchronous circuit
- Synchronous motor
- Synchronous rectification
- Synchroscope
- Syncom
- System identification
- System on a chip
- System on module
- Systems analysis

== T ==
- Tachometer
- Tap (transformer)
- Tap changer
- Taylor series
- Technical drawing
- Technology
- Telecommunication
- Telecommunications cable
- Telecommunications engineering
- Telecommunications Industry Association
- Telecommunications
- Telegraph
- Telephone balance unit
- Telephone line
- Telephone
- Television
- Tellegen's theorem
- Temperature
- Tensile strength
- Tensile stress
- Tesla (unit)
- Tesla coil
- Tetrode
- Thermal conductivity
- Thermal expansion
- Thermionic emission
- Thermistor
- Thermocouple
- Thermodynamic efficiency
- Thermodynamics
- Thermoelectric effect
- Thermostat
- Thévenin theorem
- Third rail
- Three-phase AC railway electrification
- Three-phase electric power
- Three-phase power
- Three-phase
- Thyristor drive
- Thyristor
- Tidal power
- Time sharing
- Time-invariant system
- Timeline of electrical and electronic engineering
- Tin
- Topology (electrical circuits)
- Toroidal inductors and transformers
- Torque
- Total harmonic distortion (THD)
- Traction battery
- Traction current
- Traction motor
- Traction substation
- Transatlantic communications cable
- Transatlantic telegraph cable
- Transceiver
- Transducers
- Transfer function
- Transformer oil testing
- Transformer oil
- Transformer types
- Transformer
- Transformerboard
- Transient response
- Transils
- Transistor
- Transistors
- Transmission (telecommunications)
- Transmission line
- Transmission system operator
- Transmission tower
- Transmitter
- Traveling-wave tube
- Trembler coil
- TRIAC
- Triangle wave
- Trigger transformer
- Triode
- Trolley pole
- Trolleybus
- TRW Inc.
- Tuned circuit
- Twisted pair
- Two-phase electric power
- Two-port network
- Two-sided Laplace transform
- Tyco Electronics
- Types of capacitor

== U ==
- Ubiquitous computing
- Ultrasonic motor
- Ultrasonics
- Undersampling
- Underwriters Laboratories
- Unijunction transistor
- University College London
- University of Missouri
- Unix
- Unshielded twisted pair
- Upsampling
- Utility frequency
- Utility pole

== V ==
- Vacuum capacitor
- Vacuum tube
- Variable capacitor
- Variable-frequency drive
- Variac
- Varicap
- Variety (cybernetics)
- Varistor
- Varnish
- Vector (geometric)
- Vector calculus
- Vector control (motor)
- Vector group
- Vehicle-to-grid
- Vehicular automation
- Velcro
- Versorium
- Vibrator (electronic)
- Video camera tube
- Video game console
- Video processing
- Virtual instrumentation
- Virtual power plant
- VLSI
- Volt
- Voltage compensation
- Voltage-controlled amplifier
- Voltage controller
- Voltage converter
- Voltage division
- Voltage doubler
- Voltage regulation
- Voltage regulator
- Voltage source
- Voltage spike
- Voltage
- Voltage-to-current converter
- Volt-ampere
- Voltmeter
- Volumetric flow rate

== W ==
- War of the currents
- Ward Leonard control
- Watt
- Wattmeter
- Waveguide (electromagnetism)
- Waveguide
- Weber
- Welding
- Wet transformer
- Whitaker Foundation
- Whole-life cost
- Wiener filter
- Wiener process
- Williams tube
- Wind farm
- Wind power in South Australia
- Wind power
- Wind speed
- Wind turbine
- Wire
- Wireless network
- Wireless telegraphy

== X ==
- X-ray

== Y ==
- Yagi antenna
- Yahoo
- Y-delta transform

== Z ==
- Z3 (computer)
- z80
- Zener diode
- Zigzag transformer
- Zilog
- Z-transform

== Biographies ==
=== A ===
- Abramson, Norman
- Adams, Comfort A.
- Alexanderson, Ernst
- Airy, George Biddell
- Ampère, André-Marie
- Yakubovich, Vladimir
- Armstrong, Edwin
- Ayrton, William Edward
- Ashby, William Ross

=== B ===
- Bardeen, John
- Baudot, Emile
- Bechtolsheim, Andy
- Beckman, Arnold Orville
- Bell, Alexander Graham
- Bellman, Richard
- Bennett, Alfred Rosling
- Bláthy, Ottó
- Blondel, André
- Blumlein, Alan
- Bode, Hendrik Wade
- Bogoliubov, Nikolay
- Boucherot, Paul
- Brattain, Walter
- Braun, Karl Ferdinand
- Brandenburg, Karlheinz
- Brown, Charles Eugene Lancelot
- Brown, William C.
- Bright, Charles Tilston
- Bruch, Walter
- Brush, Charles F.
- Burgess, Charles Frederick

=== C ===
- Camras, Marvin
- Campbell-Swinton, Alan Archibald
- Carson, John Renshaw
- Clapp, James Kilton
- Clarke, Edith
- Coolidge, William
- Concordia, Charles
- Conway, Lynn
- Corin, William
- Crompton, R. E. B.
- Cray, Seymour

=== D ===
- Darlington, Sidney
- Darrieus, George
- Davenport, Thomas
- De Forest, Lee
- de Mestral, Georges
- Dennard, Robert H.
- Dennis, Jack
- Deprez, Marcel
- Déri, Miksa
- Dibner, Bern
- Doherty, Robert
- Dolivo-Dobrovolsky, Mikhail
- Dolby, Ray
- Duddell, William
- DuMont, Allen B.

=== E ===
- Eckert, John Presper
- Edison, Thomas
- Engelbart, Douglas
- Entz, Justus B.
- Erlang, Agner Krarup
- Espenschied, Lloyd
- Evans, Walter R.
- Euler, Leonhard

=== F ===
- Faggin, Federico
- Faraday, Michael
- Farmer, Moses G.
- Farnsworth, Philo T.
- Ferranti, Sebastian Ziani de
- Ferraris, Galileo
- Fessenden, Reginald
- Fink, Donald G.
- Fischer, Gerhard
- Fleming, John Ambrose
- Flowers, Thomas
- Fontaine, Hippolyte
- Forbes, George
- Forrester, Jay
- Fortescue, Charles Legeyt
- Fourier, Jean Baptiste Joseph
- Fuller, Leonard F.

=== G ===
- Gabor, Dennis
- Gaulard, Lucien
- Gauss, Carl Friedrich
- Gilbert, William
- Giorgi, Giovanni
- Gramme, Zénobe
- Gray, Elisha
- Grimsdale, Richard
- Guillemin, Ernst A.

=== H ===
- Hadfield, Robert
- Hammer, Edward E.
- Hartley, Ralph
- Halske, Johann Georg
- Heaviside, Oliver
- Hefner-Alteneck, Friedrich von
- Heil, Oskar
- Héroult, Paul
- Hertz, Heinrich
- Hewitt, Peter Cooper
- Hewlett, William Reddington
- Hoff, Marcian
- Hopkinson, Edward
- Hopkinson, John
- Hopper, Grace
- Horowitz, Paul
- Houston, Edwin J.
- Hirst, Hugo
- Hull, Albert
- Hyland, Lawrence A.

=== I ===
- Insull, Samuel

=== J ===
- Jenkin, Fleeming
- Joy, Bill

=== K ===
- Kálmán, Rudolf
- Kando, Kálmán
- Keith, Nathaniel S.
- Kennelly, Arthur E.
- Kettering, Charles
- Kilby, Jack
- Knoll, Max
- Kolmogorov, Andrey
- Kraus, John D.
- Kroemer, Herbert--
- Krylov, Nikolay Mitrofanovich

=== L ===
- Laithwaite, Eric
- Lamarr, Hedy
- Lamm, Uno
- Lamme, Benjamin G.
- Leclanché, Georges
- Leeds, Morris E.
- Leonard, Harry Ward
- Lodygin, Alexander
- Lyapunov, Alexander

=== M ===
- Mäkitalo, Östen
- Marconi, Guglielmo
- Marsh, Orlando R.
- Marx, Erwin Otto
- Mauchly, John
- Maxwell, James Clerk
- Merrill, William Henry
- Minorsky, Nicolas
- Merz, Charles Hesterman
- Metcalfe, Robert
- Moll, John L.
- Moog, Robert
- Moore, Daniel McFarlan

=== N ===
- Nakamura, Shuji
- Nichols, Nathaniel B.
- Norton, Edward Lawry
- Noyce, Robert
- Nyquist, Harry

=== O ===
- Ohm, Georg
- Oliver, Bernard M.
- Olsen, Kenneth
- Ovshinsky, Stanford R.

=== P ===
- Packard, David
- Park, Robert H.
- Parsons, Charles Algernon
- Pederson, Donald
- Pierce, G. W.
- Pontryagin, Lev Semenovich
- Pope, Franklin Leonard
- Popov, Vasile M.
- Poulsen, Valdemar
- Preece, William Henry
- Pupin, Michael I.

=== R ===
- Ragazzini, John R.
- Ramo, Simon
- Ranger, Richard H.
- Reeves, Alec
- Reis, Johann Philipp
- Rickover, Hyman G.
- Rogers, Edward S. Sr.
- Rosen, Harold
- Round, H. J.
- Routh, Edward John
- Rudenberg, Reinhold

=== S ===
- Schwendler, Carl Louis
- Seebeck, Thomas Johann
- Shannon, Claude E.
- Shallenberger, Oliver B.
- Shockley, William B.
- Siedel, Philipp Ludwig
- Schouhamer Immink, Kees A.
- Siemens, Alexander
- Siemens, Carl Wilhelm
- Siemens, Ernst Werner von
- Smith, Phillip Hagar
- Spencer, Percy
- Sprague, Frank J.
- Stanley, William, Jr.
- Starr, Chauncey
- Steinmetz, Charles Proteus

=== T ===
- Tarzian, Sarkes
- Taylor, Albert H.
- Tellegen, Bernard D. H.
- Tesla, Nikola
- Thomson, Elihu
- Thompson, Silvanus P.
- Thomson, William
- Thury, René
- Tihanyi, Kálmán
- Tukey, John

=== V ===
- Van Depoele, Charles Joseph
- Varley, C. F.
- Vidmar, Milan
- Viterbi, Andrew
- Volta, Alessandro
- von Lieben, Robert
- von Miller, Oskar

=== W ===
- Wadley, Trevor
- Watson-Watt, Robert
- Watt, James
- Westinghouse, George
- Wheatstone, Charles
- Wheeler, Harold Alden
- Whitaker, Uncas A.
- Widlar, Bob
- Wiener, Norbert
- Wirth, Niklaus
- Wozniak, Steve

=== Y ===
- Yablochkov, Pavel
- Yagi, Hidetsugu
- Yang, Jerry

=== Z ===
- Zames, George
- Zobel, Otto Julius
- Zuse, Konrad
