= Circuits, Systems, and Signal Processing =

Scientific journal

- Discipline: Electrical engineering
- Language: English
- Edited by: M. N. S. Swamy

Publication details
- History: 1982—present
- Publisher: Springer
- Frequency: Monthly
- Impact factor: 2.5 (2025)

Standard abbreviations
- ISO 4: Circuits Syst. Signal Process.

Indexing
- ISSN: 0278-081X (print); 1531-5878 (web)

Links
- Journal homepage; Online access; Online archive

Circuits, Systems, and Signal Processing is a peer-reviewed scientific journal published monthly by Springer Science+Business Media. Established in 1982, it covers advances in circuit theory, linear and nonlinear system analysis, analog and digital signal processing and VLSI. Its founding editors-in-chief were Armen H. Zemanian (Stony Brook University) and Sydney Richard Parker (Naval Postgraduate School); M. N. S. Swamy (Concordia University) serves as the current editor-in-chief.

== Abstracting and indexing ==
The journal is abstracted and indexed in:

- Current Contents/Electronics & Telecommunications Collection
- Current Contents/Engineering, Computing & Technology
- EBSCO databases
- Ei Compendex
- Inspec
- ProQuest databases
- Science Citation Index Expanded
- Scopus
- zbMATH

According to the Journal Citation Reports, the journal has a 2025 impact factor of 2.5.
