= Loss factor =

Loss factor may refer to:

- Loss factor, in real estate the percentage of the building's area shared by tenants or space that are dedicated to the common areas of a building used to calculate the difference between the net (usable) and gross (billable) areas.
- Load-loss factor, in electricity distribution a ratio between average and peak values of loss of electric power between the generator and the consumer.
- Dielectric loss.
