= Microwave analog signal processing =

Microwave Real-time Analog Signal Processing (R-ASP), as an alternative to DSP-based processing, might be defined as the manipulation of signals in their pristine analog form and in real time to realize specific operations enabling microwave or millimeter-wave and terahertz applications.

The surging demand for higher spectral efficiency in radio has spurred a renewed interest in analog real-time components and systems beyond conventional purely digital signal processing techniques. Although they are unrivaled at low microwave frequencies, due to their high flexibility, compact size, low cost and strong reliability, digital devices suffer of major issues, such as poor performance, high cost of A/D and D/A converters and excessive power consumption, at higher microwave and millimeter-wave frequencies. At such frequencies, analog devices and related real-time or analog signal processing (ASP) systems, which manipulate broadband signals in the time domain, may be far preferable, as they offer the benefits of lower complexity and higher speed, which may offer unprecedented solutions in the major areas of radio engineering, including communications, but also radars, sensors, instrumentation and imaging. This new technology might be seen as microwave and millimeter-wave counterpart of ultra-fast optics signal processing, and has been recently enabled by a wide range of novel phasers, that are components following arbitrary group delay versus frequency responses.

The core of microwave analog signal processing could be the dispersive delay structure (DDS) and other methods. The DDS method for example, differentiates frequency components of an input signal based on the group delay frequency response of the structure. In this structure, a linear up-chirp DDS delays higher-frequency components, while a down-chirp DDS delays lower-frequency components. This frequency-selective delay characteristic makes the DDS ideal as a foundational element in microwave analog signal processing applications, such as real-time Fourier transformation. Designing DDS systems with customizable group delay responses, especially when integrated with ultra-wideband (UWB) systems, enables a broad spectrum of applications in advanced microwave signal processing.

== Applications ==
R-ASP Applications
Radio Communication	Sensing and Detection	General Purpose
Impulse Radio	Spectrum Sniffer	Signal Compressor
FDM Receiver	Frequency Sector Detection	Non-Linear Phase Shifter
Dispersion Multiple Access	RFID	Distortion Equalizer
	RADAR	

RFID System:

Over the past few years, RFID systems have gained significant attention in the microwave community due to their applications in areas like communications, logistics, transportation, and security. A typical RFID system consists of a reader (interrogator) and multiple tags, which can operate over both long and short distances. RFID tags are either active or passive, with passive tags further divided into chip-based and chipless types. Chipless tags are particularly attractive due to their low cost, as they lack integrated circuits. Conventional time-domain RFIDs rely on pulse-position modulation (PPM) coding but are prone to interference from reflections. A new approach addresses this by using transmission-type all-pass dispersive delay structures (DDS/Phaser) to generate PPM codes, offering a simple, passive, and frequency-scalable RFID solution.

Frequency Meter:

A dispersive delay structure (DDS) with a linear group delay response can be utilized in frequency meter applications by mapping the frequency of an incoming signal to a time delay. As the input signal travels through the DDS, each frequency component experiences a different delay, allowing the system to distinguish between frequencies based on their time delays. By increasing the slope of the group delay versus frequency (i.e., enhancing the rate of change of delay with frequency), the time delay difference between two closely spaced frequencies becomes larger. This increased time separation allows for finer resolution in distinguishing closely spaced frequencies, thus improving the frequency resolution of the meter.

FDM Receiver:

A dispersive delay structure (DDS) also called Phaser with a linear group delay response can simplify frequency division multiplexing (FDM) by mapping each frequency component of the multiplexed signal to a specific time delay. In such an FDM system, a C-section all-pass DDS separates the signal's frequencies in the time domain, eliminating the need for complex analog and digital circuits typically used in conventional FDM receivers. This purely analog approach not only reduces system complexity but also avoids the limitations of digital circuits, such as high power consumption, low speed, and increased cost at high frequencies, while offering scalability across different frequency ranges.

Pulse Compression:

Microwave analog signal processing can compress pulses and create wideband pulses using low-cost techniques that capitalize on analog approaches.

Spectrum Sniffing:

A dispersive delay structure can play a crucial role in low-cost time-domain spectrum sniffing for cognitive radio systems. This approach leverages a group-delay phaser, which enables real-time frequency discrimination without the limitations typically associated with conventional digital spectrum sniffers that rely on fast Fourier transform (FFT) techniques. The conventional digital systems often require complex and expensive processors, particularly when handling large bandwidths and high frequencies. In contrast, the phaser-based design utilizes the passive and broadband nature of dispersive delay structures, resulting in a simple, cost-effective, and frequency-scalable architecture. By mitigating the issue of pulse spreading, which can impair frequency resolution in traditional phasers, this innovative method allows for efficient real-time spectrum analysis, identifying available frequency bands for opportunistic use, thus enhancing channel reliability and data throughput in wireless networks.

Real-Time Sector Detection System:

The leaky-wave antenna (LWA), as a type of dispersive structure, can be effectively utilized for real-time signal processing to create a system for incoming frequency sector detection. Its unique design allows it to radiate energy continuously along its length, making it sensitive to incoming signals from different directions and frequencies. By reconfiguring the LWA, the system can dynamically steer its detection capabilities to focus on specific angles of arrival. This enables the identification of the direction and frequency of incoming signals in real time, facilitating enhanced spectrum awareness. Coupled with a tunable bandpass filter, the LWA can isolate and analyze specific frequency bands, thereby providing valuable information about spectrum occupancy and enabling cognitive radio systems to opportunistically exploit available channels for improved efficiency and reliability in wireless communications.

Enhanced-SNR Impulse Radio Transceiver:

Dispersive delay structures (DDS), specifically phasers with opposite chirping slopes, can significantly enhance the signal-to-noise ratio (SNR) of wideband impulse radio transceivers. In this approach, the transmitted impulse is up-chirped using an up-chirp phaser, which stretches the pulse duration while reducing its peak power, allowing for a more efficient transmission with less risk of exceeding power spectral density limits. Upon reception, the incoming signal, which contains both the desired impulse and noise, is processed through a down-chirp phaser. This phaser effectively compresses the received chirped signal back into a sharper impulse while spreading out the burst noise, which had not been pre-chirped, thus mitigating its impact. Meanwhile, Gaussian noise remains unaffected in its spectral characteristics. As a result, the desired signal is enhanced relative to the noise, achieving SNR improvements of several factors for burst and Gaussian noise types. This simple and low-cost system benefits from the broadband nature of phasers, making it suitable for applications in impulse radio ranging and communications.

Dispersion-code Multiple Access (DCMA):

Dispersion Code Multiple Access (DCMA) is an innovative patented communication technique that leverages Chebyshev polynomials to encode and transmit multiple data streams over a shared medium. Each data input, consisting of impulses, is encoded using a distinct Chebyshev polynomial order to create unique dispersive frequency patterns. This encoding ensures that the signals are sufficiently dispersed and distinguishable, allowing multiple users or data streams to coexist without interference. The encoded signals are then transmitted simultaneously through a common channel.

At the receiver, the system applies an inverse Chebyshev response, acting as a dispersive delay structure to decode and recover each individual data stream. This precise decoding process ensures that even weak signals, potentially buried below the noise level, can be accurately recovered, making the technique highly robust against noise and interference. DCMA offers an efficient and reliable method for multiple access communication, suitable for applications requiring strong noise immunity and optimal spectrum utilization, such as IoT networks, wireless communication, and secure data transfer.

== Advantages and challenges ==
Microwave real-time analog signal processing presents a transformative approach to signal processing, particularly at high frequencies where traditional digital signal processing (DSP) methods face limitations. One of the primary advantages of R-ASP is its ability to manipulate signals in their pristine analog form, allowing for lower complexity and faster processing speeds. This is crucial in applications requiring high spectral efficiency, such as communications, radar, and imaging. Additionally, R-ASP leverages dispersive delay structures, or phasers, which enhance resolution and enable real-time operations without the latency often associated with digital systems.

However, despite its benefits, R-ASP encounters several challenges that must be addressed. The enhancement of resolution, achieved through the manipulation of group delay, often leads to increased size and insertion loss in the system. These factors can compromise efficiency and signal integrity, particularly in high-bandwidth applications. Furthermore, designing and fabricating phasers with the desired higher-order group-delay responses is technically complex and costly, which may hinder the widespread implementation of R-ASP technologies.

To address these challenges, several strategies can be employed:

1. Advanced Material Use: Exploring novel materials, such as metamaterials or photonic crystals, can provide enhanced properties for phasers, leading to reduced size and lower insertion loss.
2. Optimization of Phaser Design: Implementing simulation-based design optimization tools can refine phaser characteristics, using techniques like machine learning to predict performance outcomes.
3. Integrated Circuit Solutions: Investigating the integration of R-ASP components with existing semiconductor technologies can create compact, high-performance integrated circuits, leveraging both analog and digital processing strengths.
4. Modular Design Approaches: Developing modular phaser designs that allow for easy adjustment or reconfiguration can optimize specific system requirements without necessitating entirely new designs.
5. Enhanced Fabrication Techniques: Utilizing advanced fabrication methods, such as 3D printing, microfabrication, or lithography, can enable the creation of complex geometries at smaller scales, reducing overall system size while maintaining performance.
6. Real-time Calibration and Feedback: Implementing real-time calibration techniques can dynamically adjust phaser characteristics based on operating conditions, ensuring optimal performance as environmental conditions change.
7. Research Collaboration: Fostering collaboration between academia, industry, and research institutions can drive innovation in phaser technology and R-ASP applications, leading to more rapid advancements in the field.
8. Prototype Testing and Iteration: Establishing a robust prototyping and testing framework allows for rapid iteration of designs, providing valuable insights into performance limitations and guiding future improvements.

By focusing on these strategies, researchers and engineers can work towards overcoming the current challenges in R-ASP, ultimately enhancing its viability and performance in high-frequency applications. Balancing these challenges with the inherent advantages of R-ASP will be crucial for advancing its application in next-generation wireless systems and other critical areas.

== Conclusion ==
Microwave real-time analog signal processing emerges as a crucial innovation addressing the challenges posed by purely digital signal processing at microwave and millimeter-wave frequencies. By enabling signal manipulation in its pristine analog form and leveraging dispersive delay structures such as phasers, R-ASP provides lower complexity, faster processing speeds, and reduced power consumption—critical for high-frequency applications. With its ability to perform complex operations like pulse compression, spectrum sniffing, and real-time Fourier transformation, R-ASP is transforming fields such as communication, sensing, radar, and instrumentation.

Despite its advantages, R-ASP faces challenges, such as increased size and insertion loss associated with resolution enhancements, as well as complexities in phaser design and fabrication for higher-order responses. However, strategic approaches—such as utilizing advanced materials, optimizing phaser designs, integrating circuit solutions, and fostering research collaboration—offer pathways to overcome these limitations.

Innovations like Dispersion Code Multiple Access (DCMA) exemplify the future potential of R-ASP by combining the unique encoding capability of Chebyshev polynomials with dispersive delay-based decoding. DCMA enhances spectrum utilization by allowing multiple signals to coexist over shared media with minimal interference and excellent noise immunity, even at low signal-to-noise ratios. This blend of analog signal processing principles with coding techniques offers solutions for modern radio engineering, allowing for high-performance communication systems and next-generation wireless applications.
