= Insulation system =

System for classifying electrical insulation based on maximum safe operating temperature

The electrical insulation system for wires used in generators, electric motors, transformers, and other wire-wound electrical components is divided into different classes by temperature and temperature rise. The electrical insulation system is sometimes referred to as insulation class or thermal classification. The different classes are defined by NEMA, Underwriters Laboratories (UL), and IEC standards.

For complete electrically operated appliances, the "insulation system" is the overall design of electrical insulation of the energized components to ensure correct function of the device and protection of the user from electric shock.

== Temperature classes ==
IEC 60085 Thermal class	Old IEC 60085 Thermal class	NEMA Class	NEMA/UL Letter class	Maximum hot spot temperature allowed	Relative thermal endurance index (°C)	Typical materials
90	Y			90 °C	>90 - 105	Unimpregnated paper, silk, cotton, vulcanized natural rubber, thermoplastics that soften above 90 °C
105	A	105	A	105 °C	>105 - 120	Organic materials such as cotton, silk, paper, some synthetic fibers
120	E			120 °C	>120 - 130	Polyurethane, epoxy resins, polyethylene terephthalate, and other materials that have shown usable lifetime at this temperature
130	B	130	B	130 °C	>130 - 155	Inorganic materials such as mica, glass fibers, asbestos, with high-temperature binders, or others with usable lifetime at this temperature
155	F	155	F	155 °C	>155 - 180	Class 130 materials with binders stable at the higher temperature, or other materials with usable lifetime at this temperature
180	H	180	H	180 °C	>180 - 200	Silicone elastomers, and Class 130 inorganic materials with high-temperature binders, or other materials with usable lifetime at this temperature
200	N		N	200 °C	>200 - 220	As for Class B, and including teflon
220	R	220	R	220 °C	>220 - 250	As for IEC class 200
			S	240 °C		Polyimide enamel or Polyimide films
250				250 °C	>250	As for IEC class 200. Further IEC classes designated numerically at 25 °C increments.

The maximum hot-spot operating temperature is reached by adding the rated ambient temperature of the machine (often 40 °C), a temperature rise, and a 10 °C hot-spot allowance. Electrical machines are usually designed with an average temperature below the rated hot-spot temperature to allow for acceptable life. Insulation does not suddenly fail if the hot-spot temperature is reached, but useful operating life declines rapidly; a rule of thumb is a halving of life for every 10 °C temperature increase.

Older editions of standards listed materials to be used for the various temperature classes. Modern editions of standards are proscriptive, only indicating that the insulation system must provide acceptable life at the specified temperature rise.

In large machines, different systems may be used according to the predicted temperature rise of the machine; for example, in large hydroelectric generators, stator windings may be Class B but the more difficult to cool rotor winding may be Class F.

== Categories of insulation ==
In IEC standards, the insulation system is a classification based on the level of electrical shock protection given to a user. Functional insulation that is required to prevent short circuits within the equipment. Basic insulation is any material added to protect a user from accidental contact with energized parts. Supplemental insulation is rated to withstand 1500 volts AC. Double insulation is a design concept where failure of one insulation system will not expose the user to a shock hazard due to the presence of a second independent layer of insulation. Reinforced insulation is a supplemental insulation system that is strong enough to effectively perform as if a double insulation system was present. Selection of the insulation system is coordinated with the choice of appliance class.

== See also ==
- Insulator (electricity)
- Electrical insulation paper
