= Soken tester =

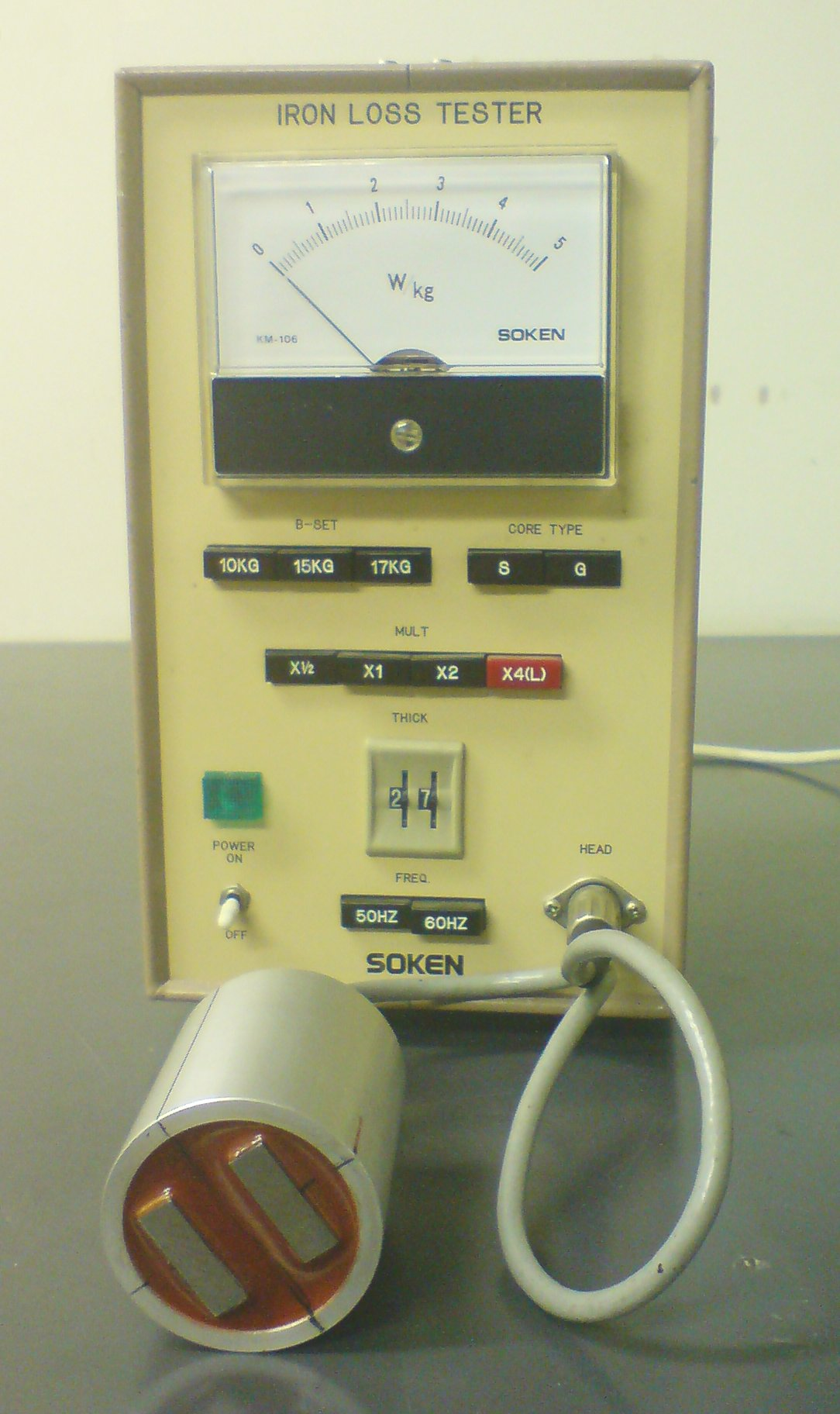
Soken tester

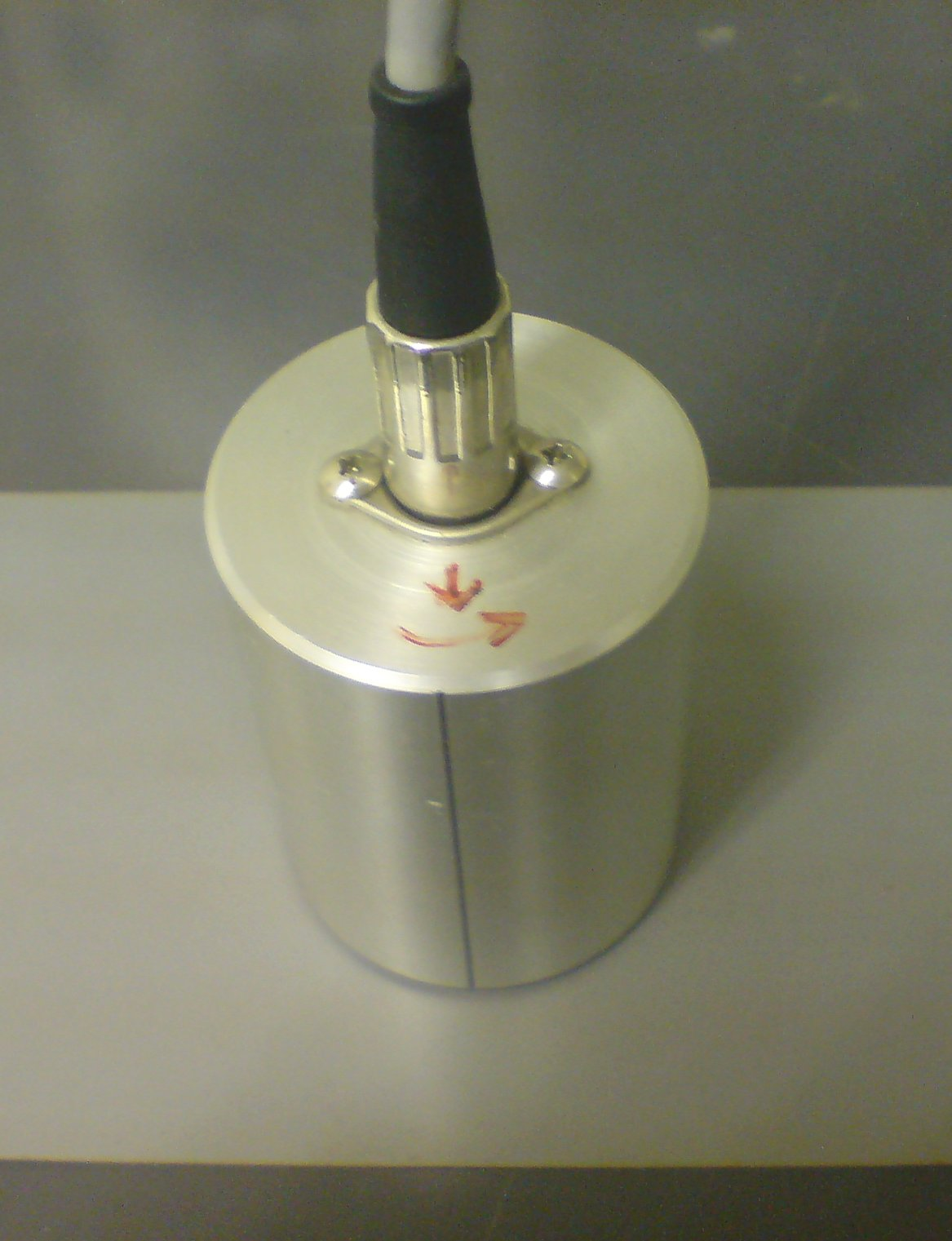
Testing head on the sample of electrical steel

Soken tester - is a portable single yoke instrument for assessing the power loss in electrical steel laminations.

It has been developed for quick assessment of power loss in electrical steel sheet without the need for cutting and annealing, as it is the case for standardised methods like Epstein frame.

The power loss can be estimated at 1.0 T, 1.5 T and 1.7 T and two frequencies 50 Hz and 60 Hz. Lamination thickness can be set within a range from 0.01 mm to 0.99 mm and there is no option for selecting the material density.

The power loss is measured as a product of magnetic field and flux density. Both these signals are detected from the magnetising yoke, which is contained in an aluminium head (55 mm in diameter as shown in the photo). The flux density is measured from a secondary winding wound on the yoke. For that reason there is a great influence on the measured values, hence great care should be taken that the measuring head is placed on a clean and even sample. The measurement is based on similar principle as employed in the standardised single sheet tester.

The manufacturers of the instrument claim that its measurement uncertainty is lower than 5% (as referred to results from Epstein frame).

The Soken tester has been developed in the second half of 20th century initially as a relatively cheap and easy to use analogue device, but recently also digital devices are available.
