= Severity factor =

Wind transfomer

A severity factor is established as a coefficient to assess the dielectric severity supported by a transformer winding considering the incoming transient overvoltage (voltage spike). It determines the safety margin regarding to the standard acceptance tests either in the frequency or time domain.

Severity factors are a newly concept for analyzing the dielectric severity supported along transformer windings when a transformer is submitted to a non-standardized transient voltage waveform induced from the power system.

Two are the new factors considered for evaluating the severity supported by the insulation windings both in factory and in service. One factor is called Time Domain Severity Factor (TDSF) and another one is the Frequency Domain Severity Factor (FDSF).

== Background ==
One first approach to the concept of severity factor was made by Malewski et al. Later, Asano et al. applied the Malewski's idea for further analysis but including the concept of Energy Spectral Density (ESD) associated to the transient voltage wave. A step forward was given by Rocha et al., whom introduced a new coefficient called Frequency Domain Severity Factor (FDSF). For those situations where an internal assessment is necessary a new coefficient named Time Domain Severity Factor (TDSF) was proposed by Casimiro Alvarez-Mariño & Xose M. Lopez-Fernandez.

== Frequency Domain Severity Factor (FDSF) ==
The FDSF is calculated at transformer terminals and it is mathematically defined as

$$\mathbf{FDSF(\omega)}=
\frac{\mathbf{{{ESD}}_{noStd}}(\omega)}{\mathbf{{{ESD}}_{envol}}(\omega)}$$

where ω is the angular frequency, ESD_{noStd}(ω) is the maximum energy spectral density of the input no-standard transient voltage applied at transformer terminals and ESD_{envol}(ω) is the energy spectral density envelope for all standards dielectric tests at terminals.

== Time Domain Severity Factor (TDSF) ==
The TDSF gives further detailed information on the severity supported by the transformer windings due to the transient event coming from the power system, regarding to the internal transient response due to dielectric tests in the time domain. The mathematical expression of this factor is

$$\mathbf{TDSF(i)}=
\frac{\mathbf{{{\Delta V}}_{noStd}}(i)}{\mathbf{{{\Delta V}}_{envol}}(i)}$$

where ∆V_{noStd}(i) is the maximum voltage drop along the ith dielectric path due to the no-standard transient events and ∆V_{envol}(i) is the maximum voltage drop along the same ith dielectric path for all standards dielectric tests.

== See also ==
- Transformer oil testing
