= Electrical insulation paper =

Paper used as electrical insulation

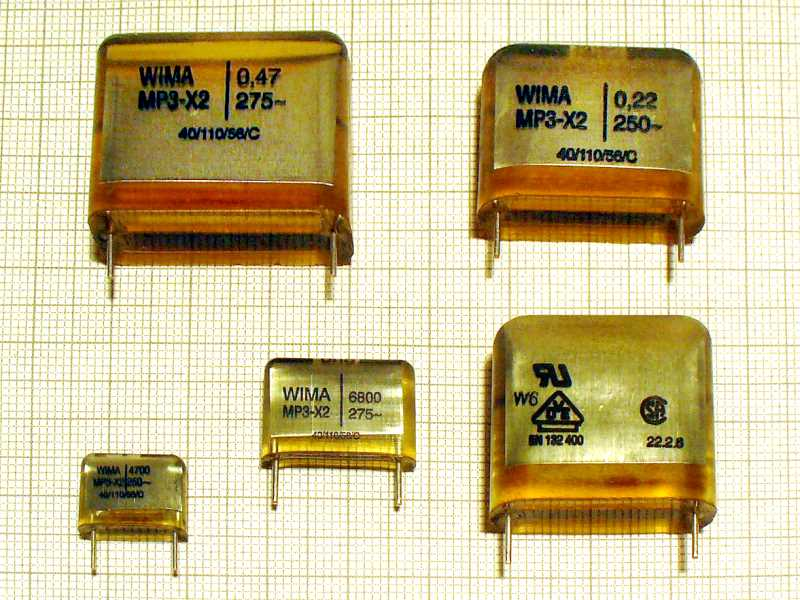
WIMA metallized paper (MP) capacitors rated X2, or "across the line" operation (typically in EMI suppression filters). These can safely connected to low-impedance AC mains at rated AC voltage (here, 250 and 275V). "Ordinary" capacitors may not be connected "across the line" even if their DC ratings are well above AC voltage. 40/110/56 marking denotes climate conditions per IEC 60068–1 (-40 ˚C to +110 ˚C).

Electrical insulation papers are specific types of paper that are used as electrical insulation. They are used in many applications due to the outstanding electrical properties of pure cellulose. Cellulose is a good insulator and is also polar, having a relative permittivity significantly greater than 1.

Electrical paper products are classified by their thickness: papers thinner than 1.5 mils (0.0381 mm) are considered tissue, while those thicker than 20 mils (0.508 mm) are considered board.

== History ==
The use of paper board as electrical insulation paper started in the early-mid 20th century. Since the need for high voltage electrical transformers, there has been a need for an insulating material that could withstand the high temparature, electrical and physical stresses experienced around a core and windings. Pressboard, a board made by compressing layers of paper together and drying them, has been used for installation purposes in many of the first electrical machines. However, as electrical technology increased, the need for a higher density material that was capable of insulating larger and higher voltage transformers grew. In the late 1920s, Hans Tschudi-Faude became the director of H. Weidmann Limited and began developing a type of pressboard that would meet the higher standards needed for the newer, more powerful transformers. Unlike older methods of pressboard production, Transformerboard was not based on used paper or cotton waste but was made with high-grade sulfate cellulose. The new product was made purely out of cellulose without a resin or binder, improving electrical insulation capabilities and could be completely dried, degassed, and oil impregnated. The new product became famous under the name Transformerboard. Throughout the 1930s, new methods of production and advances in understanding replaced almost all insulating parts of transformers with parts made from transformer board.

== Production ==
The more demanding application the cleaner the paper needs to be. Paper machines are run with deionised or even distilled process water when producing higher grades of electrical insulation paper. Electrical insulation papers are made from well delignified unbleached kraft pulp.

== Applications ==
=== Cable paper ===
Electrical cables are categorized by the voltage and current used. Telephone cables have moderate voltage and current associated with cables leading moderate electric current or transmitting electrical signals. The telephone cables have a large number of conductors that are individually insulated. The paper needs to be thin (30–40 g/m^{2}). A normal power cable needs more insulation and therefore paper with higher paper density is used, normally 60–190 g/m^{2}. The paper needs to be strong, elastic, uniform and free of holes or debris. These applications are being replaced by plastic insulation.

=== High voltage power cable paper ===
Submarine power cables at very high voltages (> 400 kV) are a very demanding application. The paper is normally 65-155 g/m^{2} and mostly produced on two ply paper machines. An advantage of using paper in sea cables is that in case of leakage, the paper will swell and prevent water from flowing along the cable.

=== Capacitor tissue ===
This paper is used in capacitors and is an extremely clean and thin tissue paper (normally 6–12 g/m^{2}) that is super calendered. The pulp is clean unbleached kraft pulp that is extremely refined. The paper is made on small paper machines with slow speeds because the stock has to be drained very slowly.

=== Transformer board ===
Transformer board is used mainly in oil-filled transformers where a solid insulating structure is needed. This is a pressboard up to 8 mm in thickness. The board is built up wet on forming cylinders and cut off when at the desired thickness. This makes a sheet with the size of the width and circumference of the drum. The wet sheets are hot- or cold-press dried and finished on separate machines.

== See also ==
- Fish paper
- Vulcanized fibre
- Insulation system
