= Iterative Receiver Design =

- Author: Henk Wymeersch
- Language: English
- Subject: Receiver Design, Factor graph
- Publisher: Cambridge University Press
- Publication date: 2007
- Publication place: England
- Pages: 272 pages
- ISBN: 978-0-521-87315-4
- OCLC: 148865760
- Dewey Decimal: 518.1 22
- LC Class: TK5103.7 .W96 2007
- Website: http://www.cambridge.org/us/catalogue/catalogue.asp?isbn=0521873150

Iterative Receiver Design is a 2007 engineering book by Henk Wymeersch published by Cambridge University Press. The book provides a framework for developing iterative algorithms for digital receivers, exploiting the power of factor graphs.

== Chapters ==
1. Introduction
2. Digital communication
3. Estimation theory and Monte Carlo techniques
4. Factor graphs and the Sum-Product algorithm
5. Statistical inference using factor graphs
6. State-space models
7. Factor graphs in digital communication
8. Decoding
9. Demapping
10. Equalization: general formulation
11. Equalization: single-user single-antenna communication
12. Equalization: multi-antenna communication
13. Equalization: multi-user communication
14. Synchronization and channel estimation
15. Appendices
