= Mendocino motor =

Low-power solar-powered electric motor

The Mendocino motor is a solar-powered magnetically levitated electric motor. With a very low power output, they are generally used as technical demonstrations only, but are a popular construction project with electronic enthusiasts.

== Description ==
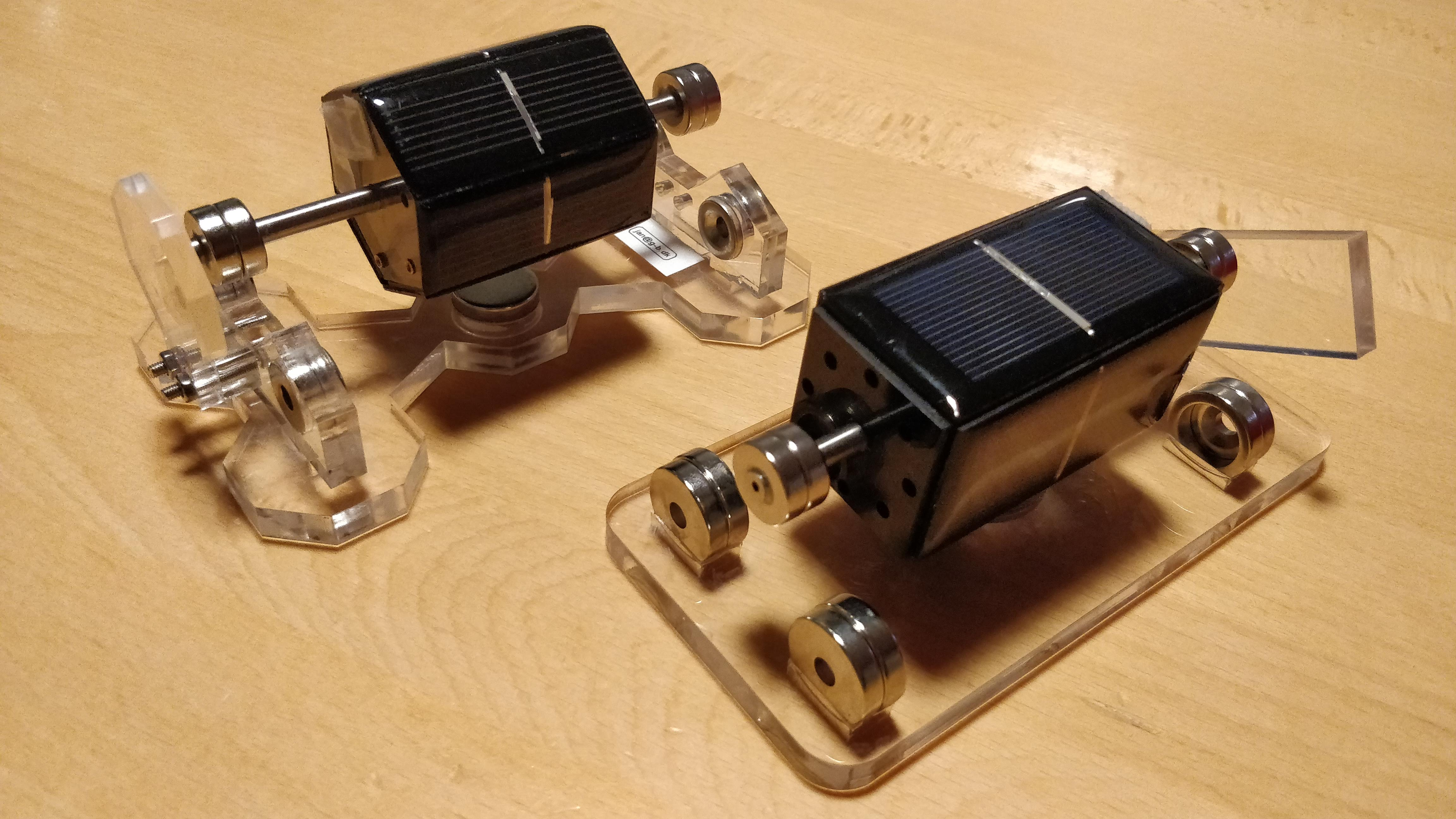
Mendocino motors, showing their rotors magnetically levitated over their bases. The most effective creating of Lorentz force is a coil laying parallel under two opposite solar panels.(see mounting instruction on https://klose-mendocinomotor.de/)

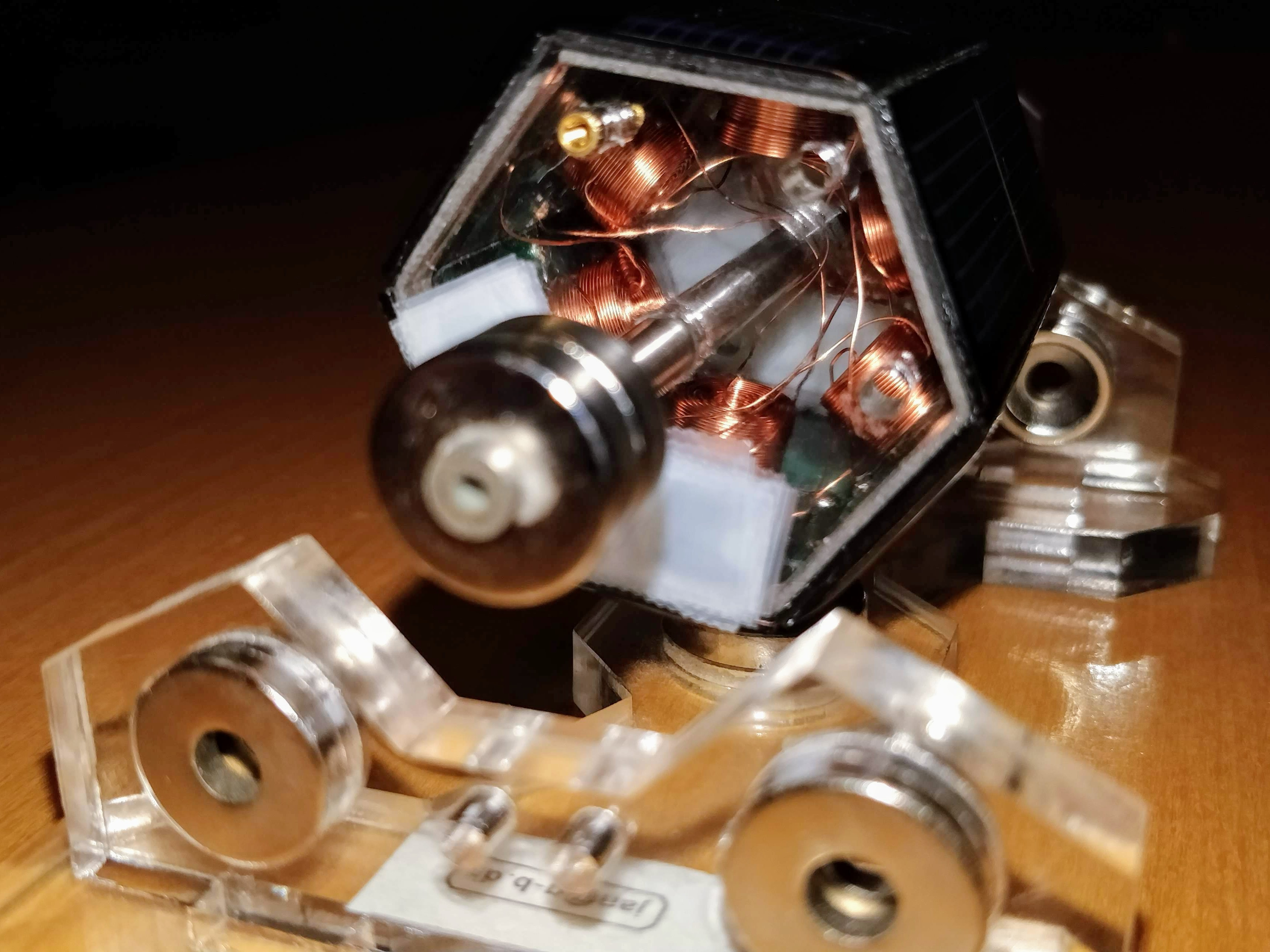
Here you can see the modified version. Easy to build but less effective.

The motor consists of a rotor shaft with an array of (typically four to eight) solar panels and electromagnetic coils arranged in a barrel shape around the centre of the shaft; this rotor is horizontally mounted in a frictionless radial bearings over a central magnet on the base plate of the motor. The final 6th degree of freedom, the axial or thrust direction, is not levitated, but rather supported by a steel ball point of contact (low friction).

An original Mendocino Motor is a light commutated motor. Two opposite solar panels are connected plus to opposite minus and minus to opposite plus. A coil is switched between these bridges. The solar panel in the sun/light produces more electricity than the solar panel in the shadow. So the solar panel in the sun dominates the flow of electricity. The coil and the base magnet create Lorentz force and so a movement that leads the next solar panel into the sun/light, thus maintaining the rotation. If the rotor is well balanced the rotor will start itself with enough light. Even a candle light could start a very well balanced rotor.

In a modification, new constructors used one coil each supported by one opposite solar panel. It's easier to produce but this design isn't as favorable as the light commutated version. Many of these motors need an initial impulse to move.

== History ==
The idea of a light-commutated motor, where solar cells power the individual coils of a motor, was first described by Daryl Chapin in an experiment kit from 1962 about solar energy. The kit was distributed by Bell Labs, where Chapin together with his colleagues Calvin Fuller and Gerald Pearson had invented the modern solar cell eight years earlier, in 1954. Chapin's version of the motor uses a vertical glass cylinder on a needle point as a low-friction bearing.

A magnetic suspension of the rotor was added in 1994 by inventor Larry Spring to create "Larry Spring's Magnetic Levitation Mendocino Brushless Solar Motor" - more commonly called "Mendocino Motor" with a horizontal rotor. The name comes from the location of his workshop on the Mendocino coast of California.
