= Epstein frame =

Device to measure magnetic properties

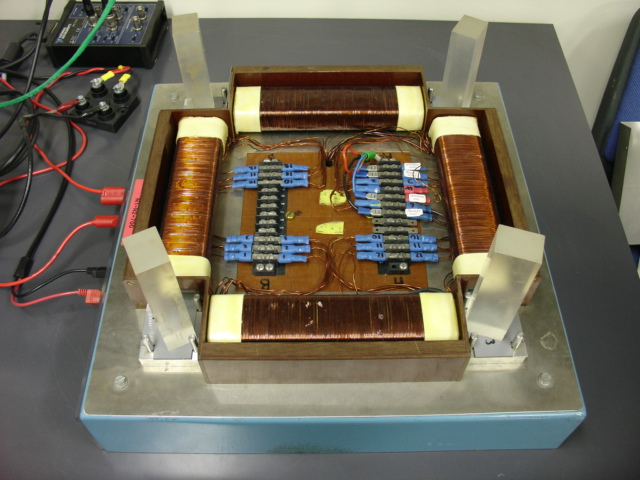
Epstein frame

An Epstein frame or Epstein square is a standardised measurement setup for measuring the magnetic properties of soft magnetic materials, especially used for testing of electrical steels.

The International Standard for the measurement configuration and conditions are defined by the standard IEC 60404-2:2008 Magnetic materials - Part 2: Methods of measurement of the magnetic properties of electrical steel sheet and strip by means of an Epstein frame published by International Electrotechnical Commission.

== Advantages and drawbacks ==
The Epstein frame is in widespread use mostly due to its standardisation, with IEC 60404-2 specifying both the sample and the windings in detail, results obtained in different laboratories can be compared with confidence. The strips are easily cut, and, for a skilled technician, less than a minute is sufficient to stack a fresh specimen into the frame.

The physical accuracy of the method is being challenged. Magnetic field behaviour in the corners of the frame is hard to analyze, thus the effective length of the magnetic path is unclear (most problematic for anisotropic materials). The standard avboids the issue by simply declaring the path length to be 0.94 m. The path length was measured experimentally, with Dieterly comparing the results to the ring-core method (the 0.94 m matched the ring-core well), and by Marketos, Zurek and Moses who found that the declared path was acceptable for non-oriented and grain-oriented electrical steels, but was noticeably off for high-permeability steel and for grain-oriented steel cut in the direction orthogonal to the rolling, as well as for fields above 1.5 T. When comparing the setup with the single sheet tester, Moses found discrepancies up to fifth of the measured loss in some cases for high fields. Uneven magnetization of the samples introduces another source of error: the flux is only uniform near the middle of each strip.

The test is destructive, thus can only be performed off-line and is difficult to automate. The amount of material used is high; this is mostly beneficial as local variations are abveraged out in the result, but represents a problem only a small specimen is available.

The limitations of the technique are ofset by the advantages; its standardisation and wide adoption continue to make it the reference against which laboratories check one another.

== Construction ==
An Epstein frame comprises a primary and a secondary winding. The sample under test should be prepared as a set of a number of strips (always a multiple of four) cut from electrical steel sheet or ribbon. Each layer of the sample is double-lapped in corners and weighted down with a force of 1 N (see photo).

The power losses are measured by means of a wattmeter method in which the primary current and secondary voltage are used. During the measurement, the Epstein frame behaves as an unloaded transformer.

Power loss, P_{c}, is calculated as:

$P_c = \frac {N_1}{N_2} \cdot P_m - \frac {\left( 1,111 \cdot |\bar{U_2}| \right)^2}{R_i}$

where:
$N_1~$ is the number of turns of primary winding
$N_2~$ is the number of turns of secondary winding
$P_m~$ is the reading of the wattmeter in watts
$R_i~$ is the total resistance of the instruments in the secondary circuit in ohms and
$|\bar{U_2}|$ is the average secondary voltage in volts.

Specific power loss, P_{s}, is calculated as:

$P_s = \frac {P_c \cdot 4 \cdot l}{m \cdot l_m}$

where:
$l~$ is the length of the sample in metres
$l_m~$ is the average magnetic path length = 0.94 (constant value)
$m~$ is the mass of the sample in kilograms

If all conditions are as defined in the standard, the standard deviation of the reproducibility of the values is not greater than 1.5% up to 1.5 T for non-oriented electrical steel and up to 1.7 T for grain-oriented electrical steel.

== See also ==
- Soken tester

== Sources ==
- Tumanski, Slawomir (2011). "2.13.3 Epstein frame". Handbook of Magnetic Measurements. Boca Raton: CRC Press. pp. 97–99. ISBN 978-1-4398-2951-6.
