= Nathaniel S. Keith =

American chemist & inventor (1838-1925)

Nathaniel Shepard Keith
- Born: July 14, 1838; Boston, Massachusetts, U.S.
- Died: January 27, 1925 (aged 86); Philadelphia, Pennsylvania, U.S.
- Occupations: Chemist; Metallurgist; Mining engineer Electrical engineer
- Board member of: AIEE
- Spouse: Anna Tait Swan (d. 1909)

Nathaniel Shepard Keith (July 14, 1838 – January 27, 1925) was an American manufacturer, chemist, inventor, writer, and electrical engineer. Keith was born in Boston, Massachusetts, and worked in his fathers laboratory. He was instrumental in designing, manufacturing, and installing the original electric lighting and power system in San Francisco, California. In 1884 he became editor of Electric World, co-founded the American Institute of Electrical Engineers (AIEE) and served as the first secretary of the organization. The AIEE merged with other societies in 1963 to become the IEEE, the Institute of Electrical and Electronics Engineers.

== Biography ==
N. S. Keith grew up experimenting in his father's laboratory in New York City. He was educated in the common schools of Dover, N. H. and New York City, and attended the New York University Medical School, but never practiced medicine. He also learned the basics of chemistry in the laboratory of his father, Bethuel Keith & Co., a physician and chemist in drug manufacturer (Bethuel Keith 1811-1884). In 1860, at age 22, he followed the Pikes Peak Gold Rush to Colorado where he spent nearly a decade mining and milling in the Central City-Blackhawk area. He experimented with various processes to work the rebellious gold ores (see "Ore Roasting Furnace" Patent No. 36437, Sept 9, 1862). Although the "Keith Process" of ore crushing and smelting worked in the laboratory, he failed to perfect the system on an industrial scale. He was superintendent of several mining operations, including the well known Mammoth mine, which closed when the vein pinched out.

Returning to the East by 1870, he became a respected New York City chemist and began experimenting with electricity. He operated nickel plating works in Newark and patented a method to remove tin from scrap, patented in 1876. He also patented early electric lights and motors, among the earliest patents. He was active in professional organizations, being a co-founder of the American Institute of Electrical Engineers and editor and founder of Electronic World. At the same time he authored Magnetic and Dynamo-Electric Machines (1884) and translated German texts on electric motors. Lured West again, in 1884 he built the first electric plant for San Francisco. Between 1884 and 1893 he was among the first to apply electricity to mining, especially electro-metallurgy. Located in San Francisco he served as consultant to mining companies across the West. He would also patent several more pieces of mine machinery (a ball crusher [the "Keith Pulverizer"]) and amalgamation equipment (the commonly used centrifugal electrical amalgamation machine). In San Francisco, he also sold electric motors to meet burgeoning demand, but sold out with the crash of 1893.

During much of 1893-1897 he was in England trying to promote his electro-metallurgical process for the extraction of precious metals from their ores. He returned to the United States and became an advisor to Thomas Edison, based in Philadelphia. He worked on the ill-fated electro-magnetic mining operations funded by Edison. He also worked on electric extraction of copper from its ores, helping organize a company to test his process in the old copper mines of New Jersey. At the time of his death he was still director or officer in a number of mining companies, including the Metals Recovery Company and the American Mines & Venture Corporation.

He married Anna Tait Swan in New York in 1860 and all three of their daughters were born in Black Hawk, Colorado—Virginia (1862), Harriet (1866), and Elma (1867). None married, but taught in a college in New York City. Anna Keith died July 2, 1909, in Philadelphia. Nathaniel Shepard Keith died January 27, 1925, in Philadelphia.
