= Wet transformer =

Wet transformer may refer to:

- A, usually large, transformer filled with transformer oil
- A telephone line isolation transformer circuit in which the line hold DC current is allowed to pass through the primary winding
