= ProlecGE =

Mexican transformer manufacturer

- Company type: Joint venture
- Industry: Electrical components
- Founded: 1969; 57 years ago in Mexico City, Mexico
- Headquarters: Apodaca, Nuevo León, Mexico
- Products: Transformers
- Parent: Grupo Xignux; General Electric
- Website: prolecge.com

ProlecGE is a Mexican transformer manufacturer located in the city of Apodaca, Nuevo León, Mexico. The wholly owned subsidiary of GE Vernova, formerly a joint venture between Grupo Xignux and General Electric (49.99%) is one of the largest transformer manufacturers in the Americas, with a 14% share of the transformer market in the United States in 2014. The company produces a line of transformer products for the generation, transmission, and distribution of electric power. In addition to operations in Mexico and the United States, the company owns two factories in India. In October 2025, GE Vernova announced it would buy the 50% stake owned by Xignux for $5.28 billion to fully own ProlecGE.

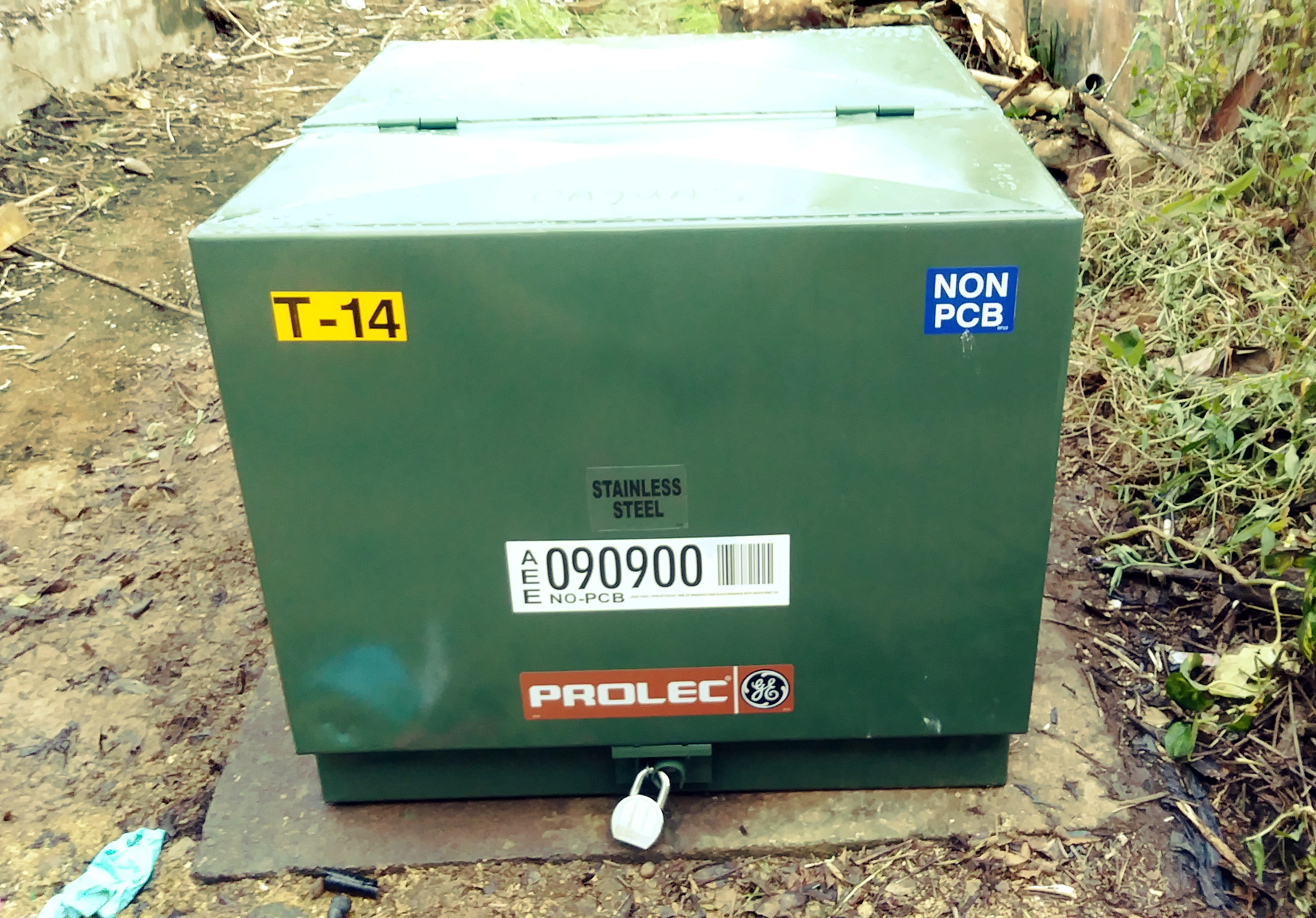
A new Prolec GE Pad Mounted Transformer in Caguas.
