= Linear transformation in rotating electrical machines =

Transformation of three phase electrical quantities to two phase quantities is a usual practice to simplify analysis of three phase electrical circuits. Polyphase a.c machines can be represented by an equivalent two phase model provided the rotating polyphases winding in rotor and the stationary polyphase windings in stator can be expressed in a fictitious two axes coils. The process of replacing one set of variables to another related set of variable is called winding transformation or simply transformation or linear transformation. The term linear transformation means that the transformation from old to new set of variable and vice versa is governed by linear equations. The equations relating old variables and new variables are called transformation equation and the following general form:

               [new Variable] = [transformation matrix][old variable]
               [old Variable] = [transformation matrix][new variable]

Transformation matrix is a matrix containing the coefficients that relates new and old variables. Note that the second transformation matrix in the above-mentioned general form is inverse of first transformation matrix. The transformation matrix should account for power invariance in the two frames of reference. In case power invariance is not maintained, then torque calculation should be from original machine variables only.

== Benefits of transformation ==
Linear transformation in rotating machines is generally carried out for the purpose of obtaining new sets of equations governing the machine model that are fewer in number and less complex in nature compared to original machine model. When referred to new frame of reference performance analysis of machine becomes much simpler, smoother and faster. All machine quantities like voltage, current, power, torque, speed etc. can be solved in the transformed model in a less laborious way without losing originality of machine properties. The most striking feature of transformation, which accounts for its high popularity, is that time varying inductances in voltage and current equations of machine are eliminated.

== Popular Transformation techniques ==
Two most widely used transformation methods are dqo (or qdo or odq or simply d-q) transformation and αβϒ (or α-β) transformation. In d-q transformation the three phase quantities of machine in the abc reference frame is referred to d-q reference frame. Transformation equation has the general form [F_{dqo}] = [K][F_{abc}], where K is the transformation matrix, for detail refer Dqo transformation. The d-q reference frame may be stationary or rotating at certain angular speed. Based on speed of reference frame there are four major type of reference frame. For detail on abc to αβ transformation refer αβγ transform

== Commonly used reference frames ==
Based on speed of reference frame there are four major type of reference frame.

- Arbitrary reference frame: Reference frame speed is unspecifie(ω), variables denoted by f_{dqos} or f_{ds}, f_{qs} and f_{os}, transformation matrix denoted by K_{s}.
- Stationary reference frame: Reference frame speed is zero(ω=0), variables denoted by f^{s}_{dqo} or f_{d}^{s}, f_{q}^{s} and fos, transformation matrix denoted by K_{s}^{s}.
- Rotor reference frame: Reference frame speed is equal to rotor speed(ω= ω_{r}), variables denoted by f^{r}_{dqo} or f_{d}^{r}, f^{r} and f_{os}, transformation matrix denoted by K_{s}^{s}.
- Synchronous reference frame: Reference frame speed is equal to synchronous speed(ω= ω_{e}), variables denoted by f^{e}_{dqo} or f_{d}^{e}, f_{q}^{e} and f_{os}, transformation matrix denoted by K_{s}^{e}.

The choice of reference frame is not restricted but otherwise deeply influenced by the type of analysis that is to be performed so as to expedite the solution of the system equations or to satisfy system constraints. The best suited choice of reference frame for simulation of induction machine for various cases of analysis are listed here under:

- Stationary reference frame is best suited for studying stator variables only, for example variable speed stator fed IM drives, because stator d-axis variables are exactly identical to stator phase a-variable.
- Rotor reference frame is best suited when analysis is confined to rotor variables as rotor d-axis variable is identical to phase-a rotor variables.
- Synchronously rotating reference frame is suitable when analog computer is employed because both stator and rotor d-q quantities becomes steady DC quantities. It is also best suited for studying multi-machine system.

It is worthwhile to note that all three types of reference frame can be obtained from arbitrary reference frame by simply changing ω. Modeling in arbitrary reference frame is therefore beneficial when a wide range of analysis is to be done.

== Restrictions ==
There are some restrictions in representing a rotating electrical machine by its d-q axes equivalent, as listed below:

- This method cannot be used on machine in which both stator and rotor are salient, for example induction alternator.
- This method cannot be applied on machine in which non salient element have unbalanced windings.
- Brush contact phenomena, commutation effects and surge phenomena cannot be represented in this model so they have to be accounted for separately.
