= Delay line =

Delay line may refer to:

- Propagation delay, the length of time taken for something to reach its destination
- Analog delay line, used to delay a signal
- Bi-directional delay line, a numerical analysis technique used in computer simulation for solving ordinary differential equations by converting them to hyperbolic equations
- Digital delay line, a sequential logic element
- Delay-line memory, a form of computer memory used on some of the earliest digital computers
- Detcord delay line loops

== See also ==
- Delay (disambiguation)
- Line (disambiguation)
