= Electronics engineering =

Sub-discipline of electrical engineering

Electronics engineering is a sub-discipline of electrical engineering that emerged in the early 20th century and is distinguished by the additional use of active components such as semiconductor devices to amplify and control electric current flow. Previously electrical engineering only used passive devices such as mechanical switches, resistors, inductors, and capacitors.

It covers fields such as analog electronics, digital electronics, consumer electronics, embedded systems and power electronics. It is also involved in many related fields, for example solid-state physics, radio engineering, telecommunications, control systems, signal processing, systems engineering, computer engineering, instrumentation engineering, electric power control, photonics and robotics.

The Institute of Electrical and Electronics Engineers (IEEE) is one of the most important professional bodies for electronics engineers in the US; the equivalent body in the UK is the Institution of Engineering and Technology (IET). The International Electrotechnical Commission (IEC) publishes electrical standards including those for electronics engineering.

== History and development ==
Electronics engineering as a profession emerged following Karl Ferdinand Braun´s development of the crystal detector, the first semiconductor device, in 1874 and the identification of the electron in 1897 and the subsequent invention of the vacuum tube which could amplify and rectify small electrical signals, that inaugurated the field of electronics. Practical applications started with the invention of the diode by Ambrose Fleming and the triode by Lee De Forest in the early 1900s, which made the detection of small electrical voltages such as radio signals from a radio antenna possible with a non-mechanical device. The growth of electronics was rapid. By the early 1920s, commercial radio broadcasting and communications were becoming widespread and electronic amplifiers were being used in such diverse applications as long-distance telephony and the music recording industry.

The discipline was further enhanced by the large amount of electronic systems development during World War II in such as radar and sonar, and the subsequent peace-time consumer revolution following the invention of transistor by William Shockley, John Bardeen and Walter Brattain.

== Specialist areas ==
Electronics engineering has many subfields. This section describes some of the most popular.

Electronic signal processing deals with the analysis and manipulation of signals. Signals can be either analog, in which case the signal varies continuously according to the information, or digital, in which case the signal varies according to a series of discrete values representing the information.

For analog signals, signal processing may involve the amplification and filtering of audio signals for audio equipment and the modulation and demodulation of radio frequency signals for telecommunications. For digital signals, signal processing may involve compression, error checking and error detection, and correction.

Telecommunications engineering deals with the transmission of information across a medium such as a co-axial cable, an optical fiber, or free space. Transmissions across free space require information to be encoded in a carrier wave in order to be transmitted, this is known as modulation. Popular analog modulation techniques include amplitude modulation and frequency modulation.

Once the transmission characteristics of a system are determined, telecommunication engineers design the transmitters and receivers needed for such systems. These two are sometimes combined to form a two-way communication device known as a transceiver. A key consideration in the design of transmitters is their power consumption as this is closely related to their signal strength. If the signal strength of a transmitter is insufficient the signal's information will be corrupted by noise.

Aviation-electronics engineering and Aviation-telecommunications engineering, are concerned with aerospace applications. Aviation-telecommunication engineers include specialists who work on airborne avionics in the aircraft or ground equipment. Specialists in this field mainly need knowledge of computer, networking, IT, and sensors. These courses are offered at such as Civil Aviation Technology Colleges.

Control engineering has a wide range of electronic applications from the flight and propulsion systems of commercial airplanes to the cruise control present in many modern cars. It also plays an important role in industrial automation. Control engineers often use feedback when designing control systems.

Instrumentation engineering deals with the design of devices to measure physical quantities such as pressure, flow, and temperature. The design of such instrumentation requires a good understanding of electronics engineering and physics; for example, radar guns use the Doppler effect to measure the speed of oncoming vehicles. Similarly, thermocouples use the Peltier–Seebeck effect to measure the temperature difference between two points.

Often instrumentation is not used by itself, but instead as the sensors of larger electrical systems. For example, a thermocouple might be used to help ensure a furnace's temperature remains constant. For this reason, instrumentation engineering is often viewed as the counterpart of control engineering.

Computer engineering deals with the design of computers and computer systems. This may involve the design of new computer hardware, the design of PDAs or the use of computers to control an industrial plant. Development of embedded systems—systems made for specific tasks (e.g., mobile phones)—is also included in this field. This field includes the microcontroller and its applications. Computer engineers may also work on a system's software. However, the design of complex software systems is often the domain of software engineering which falls under computer science, which is usually considered a separate discipline.

VLSI design engineering VLSI stands for very large-scale integration. It deals with fabrication of ICs and various electronic components. In designing an integrated circuit, electronics engineers first construct circuit schematics that specify the electrical components and describe the interconnections between them. When completed, VLSI engineers convert the schematics into actual layouts, which map the layers of various conductor and semiconductor materials needed to construct the circuit.

== Education and training ==
Electronics is a subfield within the wider electrical engineering academic subject. In electronics engineering ceramics are materials used to create electronic components. Ceramics are used for the creation of connectors, elements for encapsulation, multilayer capacitors, resistors, and sensors. Electronics engineers typically possess an academic degree with a major in electronics engineering. The length of study for such a degree is usually three or four years and the completed degree may be designated as a Bachelor of Engineering, Bachelor of Science, Bachelor of Applied Science, or Bachelor of Technology depending upon the university. During a bachelor’s degree, students usually complete a capstone course at the end of their degree. The capstone project involves designing and completing a real world project using knowledge from previous courses. Many UK universities also offer Master of Engineering (MEng) degrees at the graduate level.

Some electronics engineers also choose to pursue a postgraduate degree such as a Master of Science, Doctor of Philosophy in Engineering, or an Engineering Doctorate. The master's degree is being introduced in some European and American Universities as a first degree and the differentiation of an engineer with graduate and postgraduate studies is often difficult. In these cases, experience is taken into account. The master's degree may consist of either research, coursework or a mixture of the two. The Doctor of Philosophy consists of a significant research component and is often viewed as the entry point to academia.

In most countries, a bachelor's degree in engineering represents the first step towards certification and the degree program itself is certified by a professional body. Certification allows engineers to legally sign off on plans for projects affecting public safety. After completing a certified degree program, the engineer must satisfy a range of requirements, including work experience requirements, before being certified. Once certified the engineer is designated the title of Professional Engineer (in the United States, Canada, and South Africa), Chartered Engineer or Incorporated Engineer (in the United Kingdom, Ireland, India, and Zimbabwe), Chartered Professional Engineer (in Australia and New Zealand) or European Engineer (in much of the European Union).

A degree in electronics generally includes units covering physics, chemistry, mathematics, project management and specific topics in electrical engineering. Initially, such topics cover most, if not all, of the subfields of electronics engineering. Students then choose to specialize in one or more subfields towards the end of the degree.

Fundamental to the discipline are the sciences of physics and mathematics as these help to obtain both a qualitative and quantitative description of how such systems will work. Today, most engineering work involves the use of computers and it is commonplace to use computer-aided design and simulation software programs when designing electronic systems. Although most Electronics engineers will understand basic circuit theory, the theories employed by engineers generally depend upon the work they do. For example, quantum mechanics and solid-state physics might be relevant to an engineer working on VLSI but are largely irrelevant to engineers working with embedded systems.

Apart from electromagnetics and network theory, other items in the syllabus are particular to electronic engineering courses. Electrical engineering courses have other specialisms such as machines, power generation, and distribution. This list does not include the extensive engineering mathematics curriculum that is a prerequisite to a degree.

Various universities have updated their electrical and electronics programs to include renewable energy courses. The courses are being created because the world is shifting towards becoming more energy efficient.

=== Labs ===
Labs are essential for electronics engineering providing students with hands on experience to understand their other electronics classes. Lab activities may involve:

Breadboarding: Building basic circuits to learn components symbols involving leds, diodes, and resistors.

Microcontrollers: Programming hardware devices such as Arduino boards to control other components.

Soldering: Placing components on a printed circuit board and securing them using solder.

Renewable energy labs may involve:

Photovoltaic Energy: Using panel simulators to learn the properties of solar energy conversion.

Wind Power: Applying aerodynamics, rotor dynamics, and power generation characteristics to design and enhance wind energy systems.

Water Energy: Simulating water flow using turbines for better understanding of using water for energy.

Smart Grids: Utilizing smart technologies for advancement of electrical power systems. Involving simulation and hardware of grids from renewable energy sources like solar photovoltaic and wind turbines.

=== Supporting knowledge areas ===
The huge breadth of electronics engineering has led to the use of a large number of specialists supporting knowledge areas.

Elements of vector calculus: divergence and curl; Gauss' and Stokes' theorems, Maxwell's equations: differential and integral forms. Wave equation, Poynting vector. Plane waves: propagation through various media; reflection and refraction; phase and group velocity; skin depth. Transmission lines: characteristic impedance; impedance transformation; Smith chart; impedance matching; pulse excitation. Waveguides: modes in rectangular waveguides; boundary conditions; cut-off frequencies; dispersion relations. Antennas: Dipole antennas; antenna arrays; radiation pattern; reciprocity theorem, antenna gain.

Network graphs: matrices associated with graphs; incidence, fundamental cut set, and fundamental circuit matrices. Solution methods: nodal and mesh analysis. Network theorems: superposition, Thevenin and Norton's maximum power transfer, Wye-Delta transformation. Steady state sinusoidal analysis using phasors. Linear constant coefficient differential equations; time domain analysis of simple RLC circuits, Solution of network equations using Laplace transform: frequency domain analysis of RLC circuits. 2-port network parameters: driving point and transfer functions. State equations for networks.

Electronic devices: Energy bands in silicon, intrinsic and extrinsic silicon. Carrier transport in silicon: diffusion current, drift current, mobility, resistivity. Generation and recombination of carriers. p-n junction diode, Zener diode, tunnel diode, BJT, JFET, MOS capacitor, MOSFET, LED, p-i-n and avalanche photo diode, LASERs. Device technology: integrated circuit fabrication process, oxidation, diffusion, ion implantation, photolithography, n-tub, p-tub and twin-tub CMOS process.

Analog circuits: Equivalent circuits (large and small-signal) of diodes, BJT, JFETs, and MOSFETs. Simple diode circuits, clipping, clamping, rectifier. Biasing and bias stability of transistor and FET amplifiers. Amplifiers: single-and multi-stage, differential, operational, feedback and power. Analysis of amplifiers; frequency response of amplifiers. Simple op-amp circuits. Filters. Sinusoidal oscillators; criterion for oscillation; single-transistor and op-amp configurations. Function generators and wave-shaping circuits, Power supplies.

Digital circuits: Boolean functions (NOT, AND, OR, XOR,...). Logic gates digital IC families (DTL, TTL, ECL, MOS, CMOS). Combinational circuits: arithmetic circuits, code converters, multiplexers, and decoders. Sequential circuits: latches and flip-flops, counters, and shift-registers. Sample and hold circuits, ADCs, DACs. Semiconductor memories. Microprocessor 8086: architecture, programming, memory, and I/O interfacing.

Signals and systems: Definitions and properties of Laplace transform, continuous-time and discrete-time Fourier series, continuous-time and discrete-time Fourier Transform, z-transform. Sampling theorems. Linear Time-Invariant (LTI) Systems: definitions and properties; causality, stability, impulse response, convolution, poles and zeros frequency response, group delay and phase delay. Signal transmission through LTI systems. Random signals and noise: probability, random variables, probability density function, autocorrelation, power spectral density, and function analogy between vectors & functions.

==== Electronic Control systems ====
Basic control system components; block diagrammatic description, reduction of block diagrams — Mason's rule. Open loop and closed loop (negative unity feedback) systems and stability analysis of these systems. Signal flow graphs and their use in determining transfer functions of systems; transient and steady-state analysis of LTI control systems and frequency response. Analysis of steady-state disturbance rejection and noise sensitivity.

Tools and techniques for LTI control system analysis and design: root loci, Routh–Hurwitz stability criterion, Bode and Nyquist plots. Control system compensators: elements of lead and lag compensation, elements of proportional–integral–derivative (PID) control. Discretization of continuous-time systems using zero-order hold and ADCs for digital controller implementation. Limitations of digital controllers: aliasing. State variable representation and solution of state equation of LTI control systems. Linearization of Nonlinear dynamical systems with state-space realizations in both frequency and time domains. Fundamental concepts of controllability and observability for MIMO LTI systems. State space realizations: observable and controllable canonical form. Ackermann's formula for state-feedback pole placement. Design of full order and reduced order estimators.

==== Communications ====
Analog communication systems: amplitude and angle modulation and demodulation systems, spectral analysis of these operations, superheterodyne noise conditions.

Digital communication systems: pulse-code modulation (PCM), differential pulse-code modulation (DPCM), delta modulation (DM), digital modulation – amplitude, phase- and frequency-shift keying schemes (ASK, PSK, FSK), matched-filter receivers, bandwidth consideration and probability of error calculations for these schemes, GSM, TDMA.

== Professional bodies ==
Professional bodies of note for electrical engineers USA's Institute of Electrical and Electronics Engineers (IEEE) and the UK's Institution of Engineering and Technology (IET). Members of the Institution of Engineering and Technology (MIET) are recognized professionally in Europe, as electrical and computer engineers. The IEEE claims to produce 30 percent of the world's literature in electrical and electronics engineering, has over 430,000 members, and holds more than 450 IEEE sponsored or cosponsored conferences worldwide each year. Senior membership of the IEEE is a recognised professional designation in the United States.

== Project engineering ==
For most engineers not involved at the cutting edge of system design and development, technical work accounts for only a fraction of the work they do. A lot of time is also spent on tasks such as discussing proposals with clients, preparing budgets and determining project schedules. Many senior engineers manage a team of technicians or other engineers and for this reason, project management skills are important. Most engineering projects involve some form of documentation and strong written communication skills are therefore very important.

The workplaces of electronics engineers are just as varied as the types of work they do. Electronics engineers may be found in the pristine laboratory environment of a fabrication plant, the offices of a consulting firm or in a research laboratory. During their working life, electronics engineers may find themselves supervising a wide range of individuals including scientists, electricians, programmers, and other engineers.

Obsolescence of technical skills is a serious concern for electronics engineers. Membership and participation in technical societies, regular reviews of periodicals in the field, and a habit of continued learning are therefore essential to maintaining proficiency, which is even more crucial in the field of consumer electronics products.

== Technical skills ==
Technical skills such as knowledge of circuit design and testing circuits are incorporated in software such as LTSpice and Eagle. LTSpice is used for simulating and examining electronic circuits. Eagle is used to view and design printed circuit boards.

== See also ==
- Comparison of EDA software
- Electrical engineering technology
- Glossary of electrical and electronics engineering
- Index of electrical engineering articles
- Information engineering
- List of electrical engineers
- Timeline of electrical and electronics engineering
