= Electrical technologist =

Profession involving electrical theory

An electrical technologist is a technologist who is required to apply electrical theory on the job. Their knowledge and skill lies between that of electrical engineers and general electrical trades persons. In North America they train in a three-year diploma programs at colleges or universities.

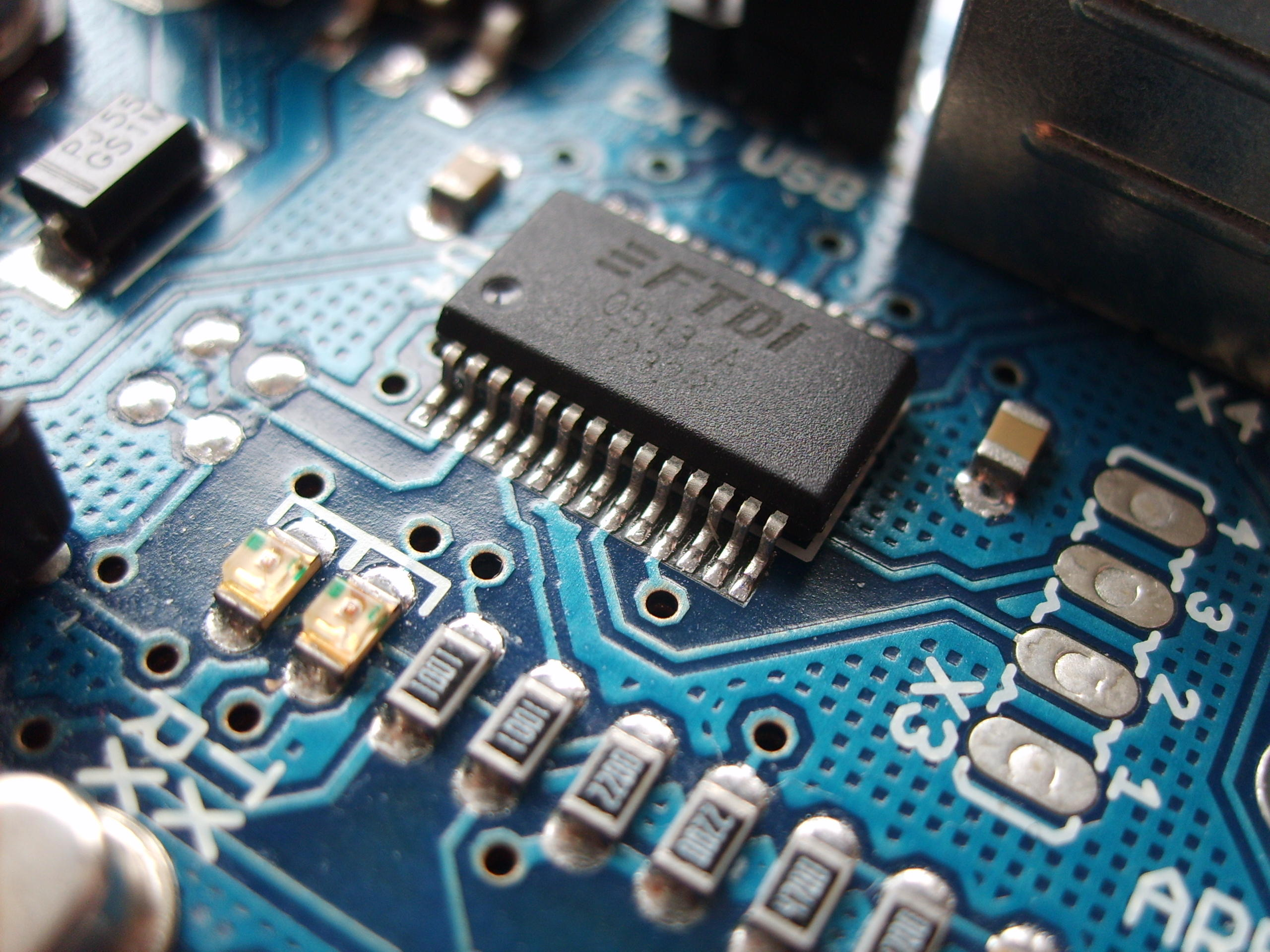
A SMD (Surface-Mount-Device) FTDI chip

Specializations within the field include instrumentation, power, telecommunications, programming and electronic controls. Electrical technologists are employed by utilities, engineering drafting/design companies, industry, and construction companies.
