= Occupations in electrical/electronics engineering =

The field of electrical and electronics engineering has grown to include many related disciplines and occupations.

The Dictionary of Occupational Titles lists a number of occupations in electrical/electronics engineering. It describes them as concerned with applications of the laws of electrical energy and the principles of engineering for the generation, transmission and use of electricity, as well as the design and development of machinery and equipment for the production and utilization of electrical power:

- electrical engineer
- electrical test engineer
- electrical design engineer
- electrical-prospecting engineer (alternate title: electrical engineer, geophysical prospecting)
- electrical-research engineer
- electronics engineer
- electronics-design engineer
- electronics-research engineer
- electronics-test engineer
- illuminating engineer
- planning engineer, central office facilities (tel. & tel.)
- supervisor, drafting and printed circuit design
- sales-engineer, electrical products
- sales-engineer, electronics products and systems
- electrical technician (alternate title: electrical-laboratory technician)
- electronics technician
- technician, semiconductor development
- cableengineer, outside plant (telephone and telecommunications)
- distribution-field engineer (utilities) (alternate title: line inspector)
- electrical engineer, power system (utilities) (alternate title: power engineer)
- electrolysis-and-corrosion-control engineer (alternate titles: corrosion-control specialist; corrosion engineer; electrolysis engineer; electrolysis investigator)
- engineer of system development (utilities) (alternate titles: development-and-planning engineer; planning engineer; system-planning engineer)
- engineer-in-charge, studio operations (radio-TV broad.) (alternate titles: chief engineer; chief engineer, broadcasting operations; transmission engineer)
- engineer-in-charge, transmitter (radio-TV broad.) (alternate titles: director of engineering; engineer, chief; transmitter engineer)
- induction-coordination power engineer (utilities)
- outside-plant engineer (tel. & tel.)
- power-distribution engineer (utilities) (alternate title: electric-distribution engineer)
- power-transmission engineer (utilities) (alternate titles: electrical-transmission engineer; transmission-and-coordination engineer; transmission-line engineer)
- protection engineer (utilities)
- supervisor, microwave (radio-TV broad.)
- transmission-and-protection engineer (tel. & tel.) (alternate title: transmission engineer)
- engineering manager, electronics
- central-office equipment engineer (tel. & tel.)
- commercial engineer (radio-TV broad.) (alternate title: traffic engineer)
- customer-equipment engineer (tel. & tel.) (alternate title: services engineer)
- instrumentation technician
- controls designer (alternate title: controls project engineer)
- integrated circuit layout designer (alternate title: mask designer)
- printed circuit designer
- drafter, electrical
- drafter, electronic (alternate title: drafter, electromechanical)
- design technician, computer-aided (electron. comp.) alternate title: digitizer)

The Institute of Electrical and Electronics Engineers (IEEE) has developed specialized groups ("societies") which professionals can join according to their specialization:

- aerospace and electronic systems
- antennas and propagation
- broadcast technology
- circuits and systems
- communications
- components, packaging, and manufacturing technology
- computational intelligence
- computers
- consumer electronics
- control systems
- dielectrics and electrical insulation
- electron devices
- electromagnetic compatibility
- engineering in medicine and biology
- geoscience and remote sensing
- industrial electronics
- industry applications
- information theory
- instrumentation and measurement
- intelligent transportation systems
- magnetics
- microwave theory and techniques
- nuclear and plasma sciences
- oceanic engineering
- photonics
- power electronics
- power and energy
- product safety engineering
- reliability
- robotics and automation
- signal processing
- solid-state circuits
- systems, man, and cybernetics
- ultrasonics, ferroelectrics, and frequency control
- vehicular technology

== See also ==
- List of semiconductor occupations
