= Load-loss factor =

Load-loss factor (also loss load factor, LLF, or simply loss factor) is a dimensionless ratio between average and peak values of load loss (loss of electric power between the generator and the consumer in electricity distribution). Since the losses in the wires are proportional to the square of the current (and thus the square of the power), the LLF can be calculated by measuring the square of delivered power over a short interval of time (typically half an hour), calculating an average of these values over a long period (a year), and dividing by the square of the peak power exhibited during the same long period:

${LLF}=\frac {\sum_{i=1}^{NI} {Load}_i^2} {NI*{Load}_{peak}^2}$, where

- $NI$ is the total number of short intervals (there are 8760 hours or 17,520 half-hours in a year);
- ${Load}_i$ is the load experienced during the short interval $i$;
- ${Load}_{peak}$ is the peak load within the long interval (typically a year).

The LLF value naturally depends on the load profile. For electricity utilities, numbers about 0.2-0.3 are typical (cf. 0.22 for Toronto Hydro, 0.33 for New Zealand). Multiple empirical formulae exist that relate the loss factor to the load factor (Dickert et al. in 2009 listed nine).

Similarly, the ratio between the average and the peak current is called form coefficient k or peak responsibility factor k; its typical value is between 0.2 and 0.8 for distribution networks and between 0.8 and 0.95 for transmission networks. Coefficient k describes the losses as an additional load carried by the system, and is named loss equivalent load factor in Japan.

== See also ==
- Line Loss Factor, a regulatory definition of the line loss in UK

== Sources ==
- Wu, Anguan; Ni, Baoshan (7 June 2016). Line Loss Analysis and Calculation of Electric Power Systems. John Wiley & Sons. ISBN 978-1-118-86709-9. OCLC 1062309002.
- Pabla, A. S. (2004). Electric Power Distribution. Tata McGraw-Hill Education. pp. 208–209. ISBN 978-0-07-048285-2. OCLC 54079002.
