= Digital signal controller =

Hybrid of microcontrollers and digital signal processors

A digital signal controller (DSC) is a hybrid of microcontrollers and digital signal processors (DSPs). Like microcontrollers, DSCs have fast interrupt responses, offer control-oriented peripherals like PWMs and watchdog timers, and are usually programmed using the C programming language, although they can be programmed using the device's native assembly language. On the DSP side, they incorporate features found on most DSPs such as single-cycle multiply–accumulate (MAC) units, barrel shifters, and large accumulators. Not all vendors have adopted the term DSC. The term was first introduced by Microchip Technology in 2002 with the launch of their 6000 series DSCs and subsequently adopted by most, but not all DSC vendors. For example, Infineon and Renesas refer to their DSCs as microcontrollers.

DSCs are used in a wide range of applications, but the majority go into motor control, power conversion, and sensor processing applications. Currently, DSCs are being marketed as green technologies for their potential to reduce power consumption in electric motors and power supplies.

In order of market share, the top three DSC vendors are Texas Instruments, Freescale (now NXP), and Microchip Technology, according to market research firm Forward Concepts (2007). These three companies dominate the DSC market, with other vendors such as Infineon and Renesas taking a smaller slice of the pie.

== DSC chips ==
NOTE: Data is from 2012 (Microchip and TI) and table currently only includes offerings from the top 3 DSC vendors.

Vendor	Device	Clock Speed (MHz)	Flash (kB)	PWM channels, resolution, duty cycle
Microchip	dsPIC30F	30	6–144	4–8 (16 bits, 1 or 16.5 ns depending on part)
	dsPIC33F	40	12–256	up 18 PWM (16 bits, 12.5 ns)
	dsPIC33E	70	64-512	up 16 PWM (16 bits, 8.32 ns)
Texas Instruments	TMS320F28x	60–150	32–512	16 PWM (13 bits, 150 ps)
	TMS320LF240x	40	16–64	7–16 PWM (11 bits, 150 ps)
Freescale	MC56F83x	60	48–280	12 PWM (15 bits, 10 ns)
	MC56F80x	32	12–64	5–6 PWM (15 bits, 10 ns)
	MC56F81x	40	40–572	12 PWM (15 bits, 10 ns)

== DSC software ==
DSCs, like microcontrollers and DSPs, require software support. There are a growing number of software packages that offer the features required by both DSP applications and microcontroller applications. With a broader set of requirements, software solutions are more rare. They require: development tools, DSP libraries, optimization for DSP processing, fast interrupt handling, multi-threading, and a tiny footprint.
