= Simon Ramo =

American engineer, businessman, and author (1913-2016)

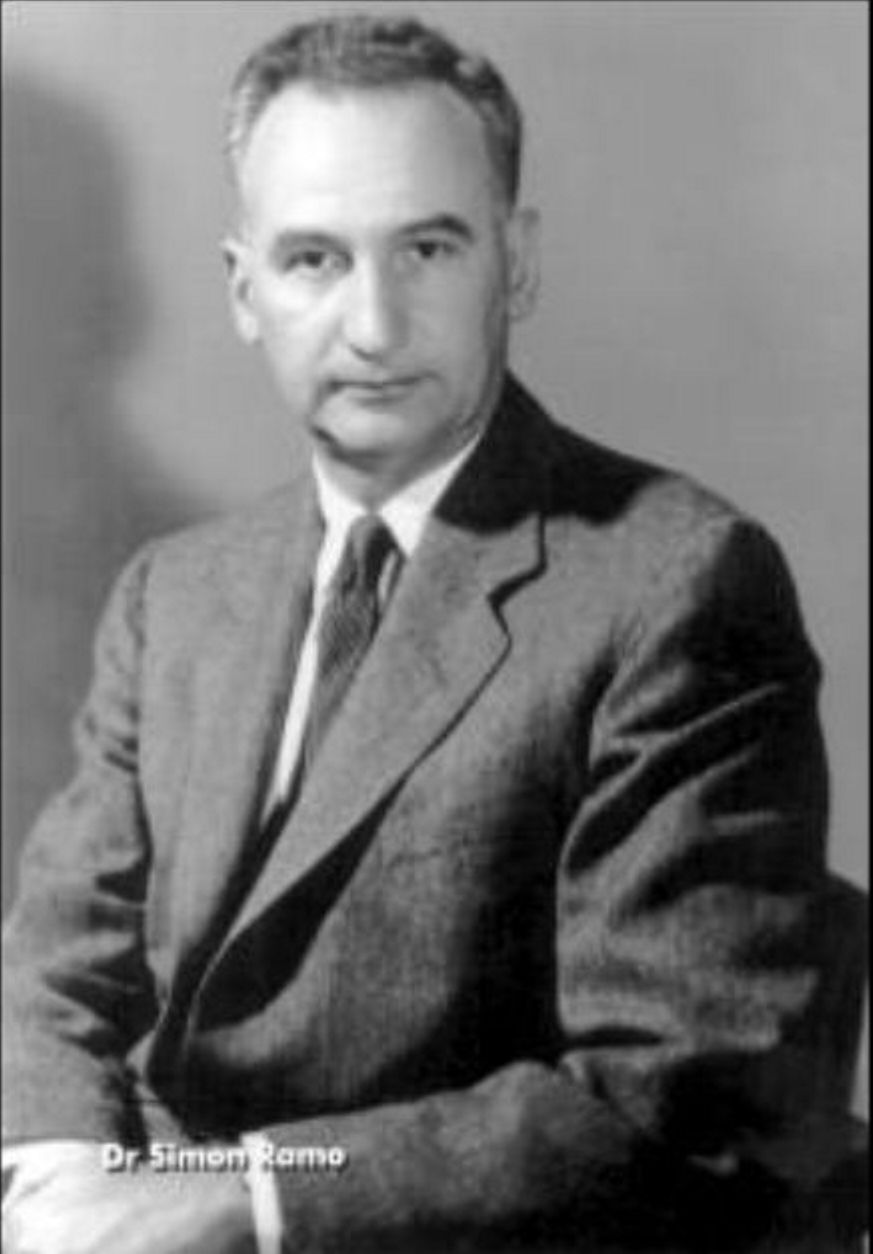
- Simon Ramo, c. 1950s
- Born: May 7, 1913; Salt Lake City, Utah, U.S.
- Died: June 27, 2016 (aged 103); Santa Monica, California, U.S.
- Education: University of Utah; California Institute of Technology
- Known for: Intercontinental ballistic missile (ICBM)
- Spouse: Virginia Smith (2 children)
- Awards: IEEE Founders Medal (1980); Presidential Medal of Freedom (1983); John Fritz Medal (1986)
- Scientific career
- Fields: Electrical engineering; Physics
- Workplaces: TRW; Bunker Ramo; General Electric; Hughes Aircraft

Simon Ramo (May 7, 1913 – June 27, 2016) was an American engineer, businessman, and author. He led development of microwave and missile technology and is sometimes known as the father of the intercontinental ballistic missile (ICBM). He also developed General Electric's electron microscope and played prominent roles in the formation of two Fortune 500 companies, Ramo-Wooldridge (TRW) and Bunker Ramo Corporation.

== Early years ==
Ramo was born in Salt Lake City, Utah, the son of Clara (Trestman) and Benjamin Ramo. His father was a Polish Jewish immigrant and his mother was a Russian Jewish immigrant. He entered the University of Utah at the age of 16, where he joined Theta Tau Professional Engineering Fraternity and earned a B.S. in electrical engineering at the age of 20. By 1936, at the age of 23, he had earned dual PhD degrees from Caltech in physics and electrical engineering.

== Career ==
=== General Electric ===
Shortly after graduation from Caltech, Ramo was hired by General Electric. From 1936 until 1946, he served as section head of the general engineering laboratory and also as head of the physics section of the electronics research laboratory. By the end of World War II, he held twenty-five patents in electronics and was cited as one of America's most outstanding young electrical engineers. He became globally recognized as a leader in microwave research and later headed the development of GE's electron microscope.

=== Hughes Aircraft ===
In 1946, unhappy with the direction of General Electric, Ramo returned to California to become director of research for the electronics department of Hughes Aircraft, and his career became coupled with that of Dean Wooldridge. Together they formed a successful team for many years, with Wooldridge concentrating on investment and general business aspects while Ramo led research, development and engineering. By 1948, Hughes had created its Aerospace Group to work with the newly created U.S. Air Force. Dr. Ramo became a Vice-President and the Group's Director of Operations. Ramo employed his skills in Systems Engineering to allow Hughes to deliver integrated RADAR and aircraft fire-control systems. He developed the air-to-air missile, creating the Falcon missile.

=== Ramo-Wooldridge Corporation (TRW Inc.) ===
By 1953 Ramo and the Air Force had become increasingly frustrated with management problems at Hughes Aircraft. Ramo and Wooldridge were particularly concerned when Howard Hughes avoided their attempts to discuss the problem. In September they jointly resigned, and within a week formed the Ramo-Wooldridge Corporation on September 16, 1953. In October 1953 an Assistant Secretary of Defense, Trevor Gardner, created a committee to consider the future of guided missiles. This Strategic Missile Evaluation Committee (SMEC) was headed by John von Neumann and included both Ramo and Wooldridge. In four months, the committee produced their report and recommended that a crash program was needed to develop intercontinental ballistic missiles, and that such a program might enable the United States to overtake Russian developments by 1959 or 1960.

With Dr. Ramo as the driving scientific and engineering officer, the Ramo-Wooldridge Corp became the lead contractor for the resulting Air Force program. In 1958, an Atlas rocket delivered a payload 5,000 miles downrange, and the Atlas would go on to serve as the launch vehicle for NASA's Project Mercury orbital flights, starting with John Glenn in Friendship 7. USAF General Bernard Schriever, head of the ICBM program, described Ramo as "the architect of the Thor, Atlas, and Titan" rockets.

During a series of key experiments of ballistic missiles in the 1950s at Cape Canaveral, Florida, at which Ramo and Air Force General Bernard Schriever were observers, test rockets kept exploding on their launch pads. When one missile rose about 6 inches before toppling over and exploding, Ramo reportedly beamed and said: "Well, Benny, now that we know the thing can fly, all we have to do is improve its range a bit." Ramo-Wooldridge later merged with Thompson Products to become TRW, and Simon Ramo became Vice-Chairman of the company. In 1964, TRW and Martin Marietta formed the jointly owned Bunker Ramo Corporation with Ramo as President, which then expanded into the computer and communications technology fields.

=== Retirement and later life ===
Although Ramo officially retired from TRW and the aerospace industry in 1978, he continued to help lead major space and weapons developments and remained an active consultant to aerospace executives and an advisor to the federal government. In January 2008, he joined the faculty of the University of Southern California's Viterbi School of Engineering as a presidential chair and professor of electrical engineering. Ramo is also a founding member of the National Academy of Engineering.

== Awards, appointments and fellowships ==
Over the course of his career, Ramo received numerous awards and fellowships. He was honored by the American Philosophical Society, the Institute of Electrical and Electronics Engineers (IEEE), the American Physical Society, and the American Academy of Arts and Sciences.

Ramo served as an advisor to the United States government on science and technology. He was a member of the National Science Board, the White House Council on Energy R&D, the Advisory Council to the Secretary of Commerce, the Advisory Council to the Secretary of State for Science and Foreign Affairs, and of many special advisory committees to the Defense Department and NASA. President Gerald Ford appointed Ramo as co-chairman of a committee of distinguished scientists and engineers, requesting Ramo to list the science and technology issues most deserving of attention by the White House and to recommend actions. Following this, Ramo was appointed by President Ford to be chairman of The President's Advisory Committee on Science and Technology, a position created by Congress to advise on how to ensure that science and technology matters receive proper attention at the White House.

In 1980, then-President-elect Ronald Reagan asked Ramo to assemble a transition task force to advise on executive branch appointments where science and technology background was desirable. President Reagan subsequently invited Ramo to be a Science Adviser to the President of the Republic of China. In that assignment, Ramo aided greatly Taiwan's development of a strong high-technology industry.

On February 23, 1983, Ramo was presented with the Presidential Medal of Freedom by President Reagan for his contributions to science, engineering, and national defense.

In 1982, the IEEE Board of Directors initiated the IEEE Simon Ramo Medal for exceptional achievement in systems engineering and systems science.

In 1988, Theta Tau Professional Engineering Fraternity inducted Simon Ramo, Lambda (Utah)'33, into its Alumni Hall of Fame.

In 2007, the Space Foundation awarded Ramo its highest honor, the General James E. Hill Lifetime Space Achievement Award.

In 2009, the Theta Tau Educational Foundation named an annual scholarship in his honor.

Additional awards:

- Founders Medal, Institute of Electrical and Electronics Engineers
- John Fritz Medal, American Association of Engineering Societies
- Medal of Honor, Electronic Industries Association
- Kagan Medal, Columbia University
- Henry Heald Award, Illinois Institute of Technology
- Annual Award, Harvard Business School
- Golden Plate Award, American Academy of Achievement
- Distinguished Service Medal, Armed Forces Communication and Electronics Association
- Delmer S. Fahrney Medal
- Aesculapian Award, UCLA School of Medicine
- Durand Medal, Institute of Aeronautics and Astronautics
- Space and Missile Pioneer Award, U.S. Air Force
- Pioneer Award, International Council on Systems Engineering
- Howard Hughes Memorial Award
- Distinguished Alumnus Award, University of Utah
- National Trophy for Lifetime Achievement, Smithsonian Institution
- NASA Distinguished Public Service Medal
- University of Southern California Presidential Medallion
- Space Foundation General James E. Hill Lifetime Space Achievement Award
- Junior Achievement U.S. Business Hall of Fame inductee

Ramo received numerous patents including one at age 100 concerning the use of technology in education making him the oldest American to be awarded a U.S. patent.

== Publications ==
Ramo authored dozens of books on topics ranging from science textbooks, corporate and technology management, society's relation to technology, economy, and how to play tennis. A selection:

- Fields and Waves in Modern Radio by Simon Ramo and John R. Whinnery (1944)
- Introduction to Microwaves (1945)
- Peacetime Uses of Space (1959, 1977)
- Fields and Waves in Communication Electronics (1965)
- Extraordinary Tennis For The Ordinary Player (1970)
- The Islands of E, Cono & My (1973)
- America's Technology Slip (1980)
- The Management of Innovative Technological Corporations (1980)
- What's Wrong with Our Technological Society—and How to Fix it (1983)
- Tennis By Machiavelli (1984)
- The Business of Science: Winning and Losing in the High-Tech Age (1988)
- Meetings, Meetings, and More Meetings: Getting Things Done When People Are Involved (2005)
- Strategic Business Forecasting: A Structured Approach to Shaping the Future of Your Business by Dr. Simon Ramo and Dr. Ronald Sugar (2009)
- Tales from the Top: How CEOs Act and React (2011)
- To Wit: A Sense of Humor - A Mandatory Tool of Management (2011)
- Let Robots do the Dying (2011)
- Guided Missile Engineering: University of California Engineering Extension Series by Allen E. Puckett and Simon Ramo (2013)

About Simon Ramo

- Stephen B. Johnson; The Secret of Apollo: Systems Management in American and European Space Programs 2002, The Johns Hopkins University Press (ISBN 0-8018-6898-X).
- Davis Dyer; TRW: Pioneering Technology and Innovation since 1900 1998, Harvard Business School Press (ISBN 0-87584-606-8).
- G. Harry Stine; ICBM 1991, Orion Books (ISBN 0-517-56768-7).
- Ernest Schwiebert; History of the U.S. Air Force Ballistic Missiles 1965, Praeger Publishers.

== Personal life ==
Ramo was married to Virginia (née Smith) from 1937 until her death in 2009. They had two sons, James Brian and Alan Martin, four grandchildren and four great-grandchildren. Ramo died on June 27, 2016, at the age of 103.

== See also ==
- List of textbooks in electromagnetism
