= System Planning Corporation =

American military technology company

- Company type: Private
- Founded: 1970
- Headquarters: Arlington, Virginia
- Key people: Ronald L. Easley, Founder and CEO
- Products: National Security Research, Electronics, Computer Software
- Website: www.sysplan.com

System Planning Corporation (SPC) is a Virginia-based corporation founded in 1970 that produces military electronics, such as flight control systems, radar, and Systems Engineering and Technical Assistance in airwarfare, cybersecurity, program management and research of advanced weapons systems, advanced space systems and advanced microsystems for the United States Department of Defense (DoD). SPC was acquired by ECS Federal, LLC in 2015. It is principal support contractor to cabinet-level departments, including the Department of Defense, Justice and State, and Homeland Security.

== History ==
SPC had its direct predecessor Systems Planning and Research Corporation, headquartered in Maryland, which started its R&D activities in the 1950s from development of the advanced range instrumentation systems for the U.S. Army missile ranges.

The conference room of SPC was also used for meetings of the Society for Operational Research, to which Viktor Vasilyevich Lozenko, a Soviet KGB officer under the cover of diplomat also belongs. In September 1980, Lozenko bugged the conference room and acquired highly important intelligence about the current and future deployment of US nuclear weapons in Europe, American chemical weapons, US navy's chances of survival in a nuclear conflict and US position on SAALT-2 talks and even Pentagon officials' classified report entitled Current Status and Trends in the Advancement of the US Nuclear Front in the Central European Theater of War in which US mobilization capabilities, the effectiveness of laser guidance systems, plans for the destruction of 730 tons of chemical weapons and other important information. The operation ended because the bugging device finally ran out of power.

== Contracts ==
SPC is one of the Defense Advanced Research Projects Agency (DARPA)'s largest support contractors and has supported DARPA virtually continuously since SPC's founding. SPC provides Systems Engineering and Technical Assistance, and support services to most of DARPA's Technology Offices.

SPC has a long involvement with the U.S. stealth program. SPC designed and fabricated one of the first specialized radar cross section (RCS) measurement radars used to validate the low observable signatures of stealthy vehicles. SPC produces RCS measurement systems, currently the MK V, which are principally used by the U.S. to provide quality assurance for deployed aircraft and ships, including the F-117A and B-2 bomber.

As of 2014, SPC has contracts for

- SEAPORT-e, the Navy's electronic platform for acquiring support services in 22 areas, including engineering, financial
- a GSA Mission Oriented Business Integrated Services (MOBIS) schedule GS-10F-0350M
- a GSA information technology (IT) contract GS-35F-0320W

== Fields of interest ==
- Radar cross section analysis
- Arms control
- Ballistic missile defense
- Homeland Security
- Continuity of government
- Nuclear, Chemical and Biological Warfare

== See also ==
- Dov S. Zakheim
