= TRW Inc. =

American industrial company

- Type: Public
- Traded as: NYSE: TRW
- Industry: Automotive and aerospace
- Founded: 1901; 125 years ago
- Defunct: 2002
- Fate: Acquired
- Successor: TRW Automotive, Northrop Grumman and Goodrich Corporation
- Headquarters: Euclid, Ohio / Lyndhurst, Ohio, United States
- Key people: Frederick C. Crawford, Simon Ramo, Dean Wooldridge
- Products: Automotive, aerospace and credit reporting
- Number of employees: 122,258 (2000)
- Subsidiaries: CAV, Girling, LucasVarity Automotive and Lucas Aerospace

TRW Inc., or Thompson Ramo Wooldridge Inc., was an American corporation involved in a variety of businesses, mainly aerospace, electronics, automotive, and credit reporting. The company was founded in 1901 and lasted for just over a century until being acquired by Northrop Grumman in 2002. It spawned a variety of corporations, including Pacific Semiconductors, The Aerospace Corporation, Bunker-Ramo and Experian. TRW was instrumental in the development of American spacecraft during the Space Race, including Pioneer 1, Pioneer 10, and Apollo. TRW also played a significant role in the defense industry, leading the development of the United States' first ICBM and later the Titan missile. The corporation was listed as #57 on the 1986 Fortune 500 list, and had 122,258 employees in 2000.

== History ==
TRW originated in 1901 as the Cleveland Cap Screw Company, founded by David Kurtz and four other Cleveland residents. Their initial products were bolts with heads electrically welded to the shafts. In 1904, a welder named Charles E. Thompson adapted their process to making automobile engine valves, and by 1915, the company had grown to become the largest valve producer in the United States. Charles Thompson was named general manager of the company, which became Thompson Products in 1926. Their experimental hollow sodium-cooled valves aided Charles Lindbergh's solo flight across the Atlantic. In 1937, Thompson Motor Products bought J.A. Drake and Sons (JADSON). The company made high-performance valves that were used in many racing engines, including the Miller Offy. Dale Drake (son of J.A. Drake) bought the Offy engine design with his partner Louis Meyer in 1946 and won the Indianapolis 500 twenty-seven times, more than any other engine design.

During the period leading up to World War II and through the end of the Korean War, Thompson Products was a key manufacturer of components for aircraft engines, including cylinder valves. The TAPCO plant, owned by the federal government but operated by Thompson Products, extended for almost a mile along Cleveland's Euclid Avenue and employed over 16,000 workers at its peak. As jet aircraft replaced piston-engined aircraft, Thompson Products then shifted to becoming a major manufacturer of turbine blades for jet engines.

In 1950, Simon Ramo and Dean Wooldridge while working for Hughes Aircraft, led the development of the Falcon radar-guided missile, among other projects. Growing frustrated with Howard Hughes' management, the two formed the Ramo-Wooldridge Corporation in September 1953, with the financial support of Thompson Products. The detonation of a thermonuclear bomb by the Soviet Union spurred Trevor Gardner to form the Teapot Committee in October 1953. Chaired by John von Neumann, its purpose was to study the development of ballistic missiles, including ICBMs. Ramo and Wooldridge were committee members, and Ramo-Wooldridge Corp. became the lead contractor of the resulting ICBM development effort, reporting to the United States Air Force. With continued backing from Thompson Products, Ramo-Wooldridge diversified into computers and electronic components, founding Pacific Semiconductors in 1954. They also produced scientific spacecraft such as Pioneer 1, and was later contracted to work on the Apollo program. Thompson Products and Ramo-Wooldridge merged in October 1958 to form Thompson Ramo Wooldridge Inc., unofficially known as "TRW". In February 1959, Jimmy Doolittle became chairman of the board of Space Technology Laboratories (STL), the division which continued to support the Air Force ICBM efforts.

Other aerospace companies believed TRW's Air Force advisory role granted it unfair access to their technologies and in September 1959, Congress issued a report recommending that STL be converted to a non-profit organization. With nearly half of STL's employees, The Aerospace Corporation was formed in June 1960. It headed the Atlas conversion for Mercury, Titan conversion for Gemini, and provided ongoing systems engineering support for the government. The Air Force continued its ICBM work with TRW. Dean Wooldridge retired in January 1962 to become a professor at California Institute of Technology (Caltech). Simon Ramo became president of the Bunker-Ramo Corporation in January 1964, jointly owned by TRW and Martin Marietta for the production of computers and monitors. Thompson Ramo Wooldridge officially became TRW Inc. in July 1965. Free of anti-competitive restrictions short of ICBM hardware, STL was renamed TRW Systems Group that same month.

In 1968, the company entered the credit reporting industry by purchasing Credit Data Corporation and renaming it TRW Information Systems and Services Inc. The Credit Data group was formed in 1970 to compete with Dun & Bradstreet, from the combination of TRWISS and ESL Incorporated to specialize in technical strategic reconnaissance. TRW Information Systems and Services Division (Credit Data) was spun off in 1996 to form Experian. TRW acquired LucasVarity in 1999, then selling Lucas Diesel Systems to Delphi Automotive and Lucas Aerospace (then called TRW Aeronautical Systems) to Goodrich Corporation.

=== Decline and acquisition ===
Toward the end of the 1980s, the company experienced a significant turndown in its defense operations following the end of the Cold War as defense spending leveled off, but continued to maintain a stable stance in the market. On 3 February 1986, a large TRW plant in Harrisburg, Pennsylvania, burned to the ground in a nine-alarm fire. The fire was listed as one of the worst in the city's history, and a state of emergency was declared due to a leakage of toxic fumes.

In February 2002, Northrop Grumman launched a $5.9 billion hostile bid for TRW. Northrop Grumman, BAE Systems, and General Dynamics all contended for the company with Northrop's increased bid of $7.8 billion, which was ultimately accepted on July 1, 2002. Soon afterward, the automotive assets of LucasVarity and TRW's automotive group were sold to The Blackstone Group as TRW Automotive. A portion of TRW's Lyndhurst campus was developed as Legacy Village, and the headquarters building became home to the Cleveland Clinic Wellness Institute. The TRW headquarters building was demolished in 2023. In 2011, the American Institute of Aeronautics and Astronautics (AIAA) designated the TRW Space Park complex in Redondo Beach, California as a historic aerospace site.

== Aerospace ==
TRW Inc. was active in the development of American missile systems and spacecraft, most notably, the early development of the ICBM program under the leadership of the Teapot Committee led by John von Neumann. TRW also pioneered systems engineering, creating the ubiquitous N^{2} chart and the modern functional flow block diagram. It served as the primary source of systems engineering for the United States Air Force ballistic missile programs.

=== Space exploration ===
Space Technology Laboratories (STL), then a division of Ramo-Wooldridge Corp, designed and produced identical payloads for Pioneer 0, Pioneer 1 and Pioneer 2. These were intended to orbit and photograph the Moon, but launch vehicle problems prevented this. NASA launched Pioneer 1 as its first spacecraft on 11 October 1958. It set a distance record from Earth, and provided data on the extent of Earth's radiation belts.

Pioneer 10 and 11 were nearly identical spacecraft, designed and fabricated by TRW Systems Group. They were optimized for ruggedness since they were the first man-made objects to pass through the asteroid belt and Jupiter's radiation belt. Simplicity, redundancy, and use of proven components were essential. As NASA's first all-atomic powered spacecraft, these used plutonium-238 units developed by Teledyne Isotopes. Pioneer 10 carried eleven instruments and Pioneer 11 carried twelve for investigating Jupiter and Saturn, respectively. Data was transmitted back to Earth at 8 watts, 128 bytes/s at Jupiter, and 1 byte/s from further out. Pioneer 10 was the first man-made object to pass the planetary orbits and its last telemetry was received in 2002, thirty years after launch.

TRW Systems Group designed and built the instrument package which performed the Martian biological experiments, searching for life aboard the two Viking Landers launched in 1975. The 15.5 kg (34 lb) system performed four experiments on Martian soil using a gas chromatograph-mass spectrometer (GC-MS) and a combined biological instrument.

=== Space-based observatories ===
TRW designed and built the following space observatories:

- HEAO 1, 2, and 3, with HEAO 2 being the Einstein Observatory, the first fully imaging X-ray telescope put into space
- Compton Gamma Ray Observatory which is the second of four among NASA's Great Observatories program
- Chandra X-ray Observatory is the third of NASA's Great Observatories

The teams developing the following observatories continued their work as part of Northrop Grumman Aerospace Systems:

- SIM Lite space telescope which would have searched for Earth-sized planets in the habitable zones around nearby stars (project canceled)
- James Webb Space Telescope, which is the successor to the Hubble Space Telescope

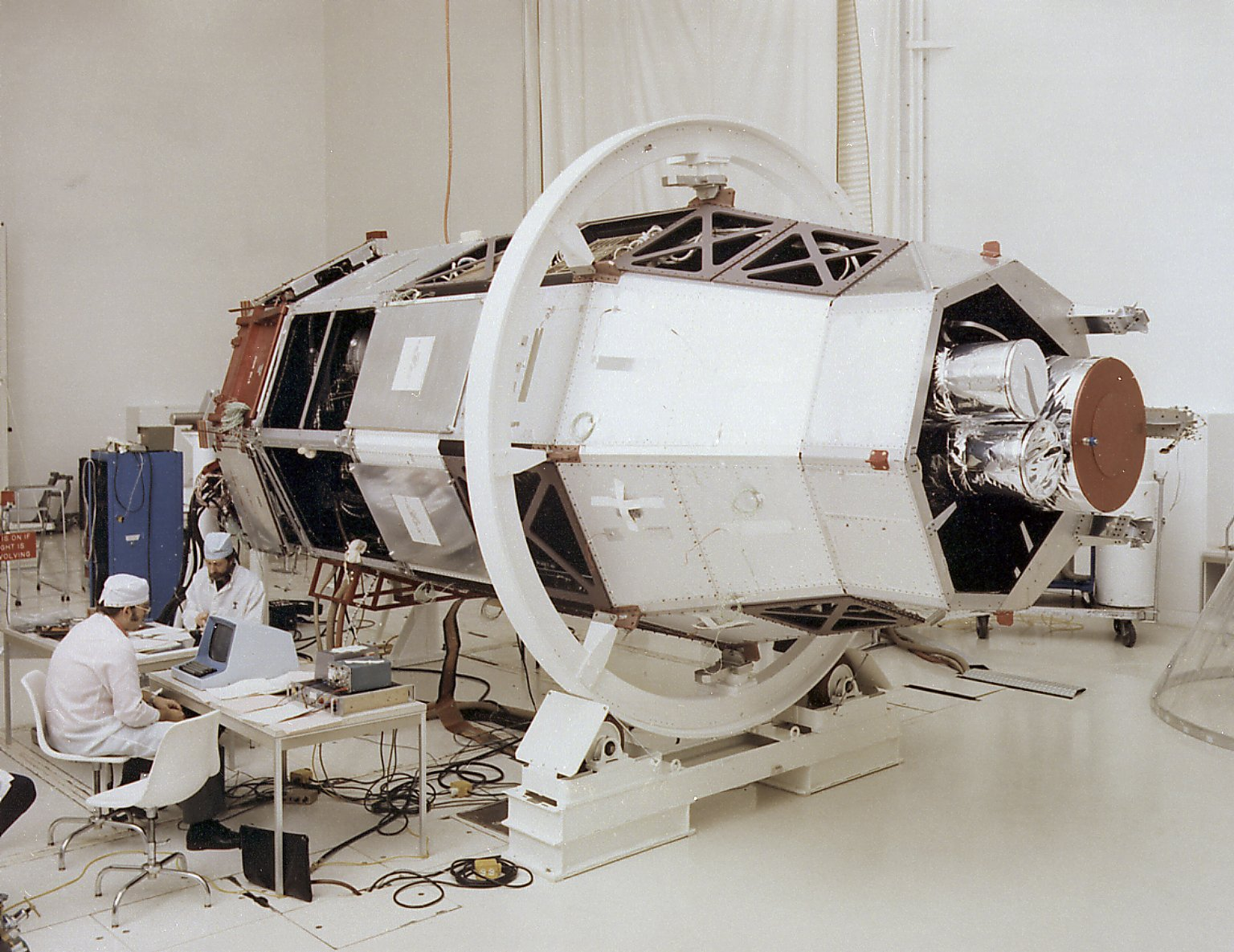
Testing of the High Energy Astronomy Observatory (HEAO) Program at TRW in 1977

=== Satellites ===
TRW Systems Group designed and manufactured the Vela series of nuclear detection satellites, which monitored the 1963 establishment of the nuclear Partial Test Ban Treaty. Subsequently, they produced the Advanced Vela series in 1967, which could detect nuclear air bursts using instruments called bhangmeters. It had the first dual-spin attitude control system with the total system momentum controlled to zero, and both satellites were the first to alert astronomers to the presence of gamma-ray bursts. They also reported a mysterious apparent nuclear test now called the Vela incident.

First launched in 1970, the company built all twenty-three reconnaissance satellites in the Defense Support Program (DSP), which are the principal components of the Satellite Early Warning System currently used by the United States. These are operated by the Air Force Space Command, and they detect missile or spacecraft launches and nuclear explosions using sensors that detect the infrared emissions from these intense sources of heat. During Desert Storm, DSP satellites were able to detect the launches of Iraqi Scud missiles and provide timely warnings to civilians and military forces in Israel and Saudi Arabia.

The initial seven Tracking and Data Relay Satellite System (TDRSS) were built by TRW to improve communication coverage for the Space Shuttle, International Space Station, and U.S. military satellites. When first launched in 1983, the TDRS satellites were the largest, most sophisticated communications satellites built at the time. The seventh vehicle in the series was ordered as a replacement when TDRS-B was lost in the Challenger accident.

Launched in 2002, TRW produced the Aqua spacecraft based on their modular standardized satellite bus. A joint project of the U.S. Global Change Research Program (NASA), Japan Aerospace Exploration Agency (JAXA), and National Institute for Space Research (INPE), Brazil, Aqua delivers 750 Gigabytes per day detailing the Earth's water cycle in the oceans, lakes, atmosphere, polar ice caps, and vegetation.

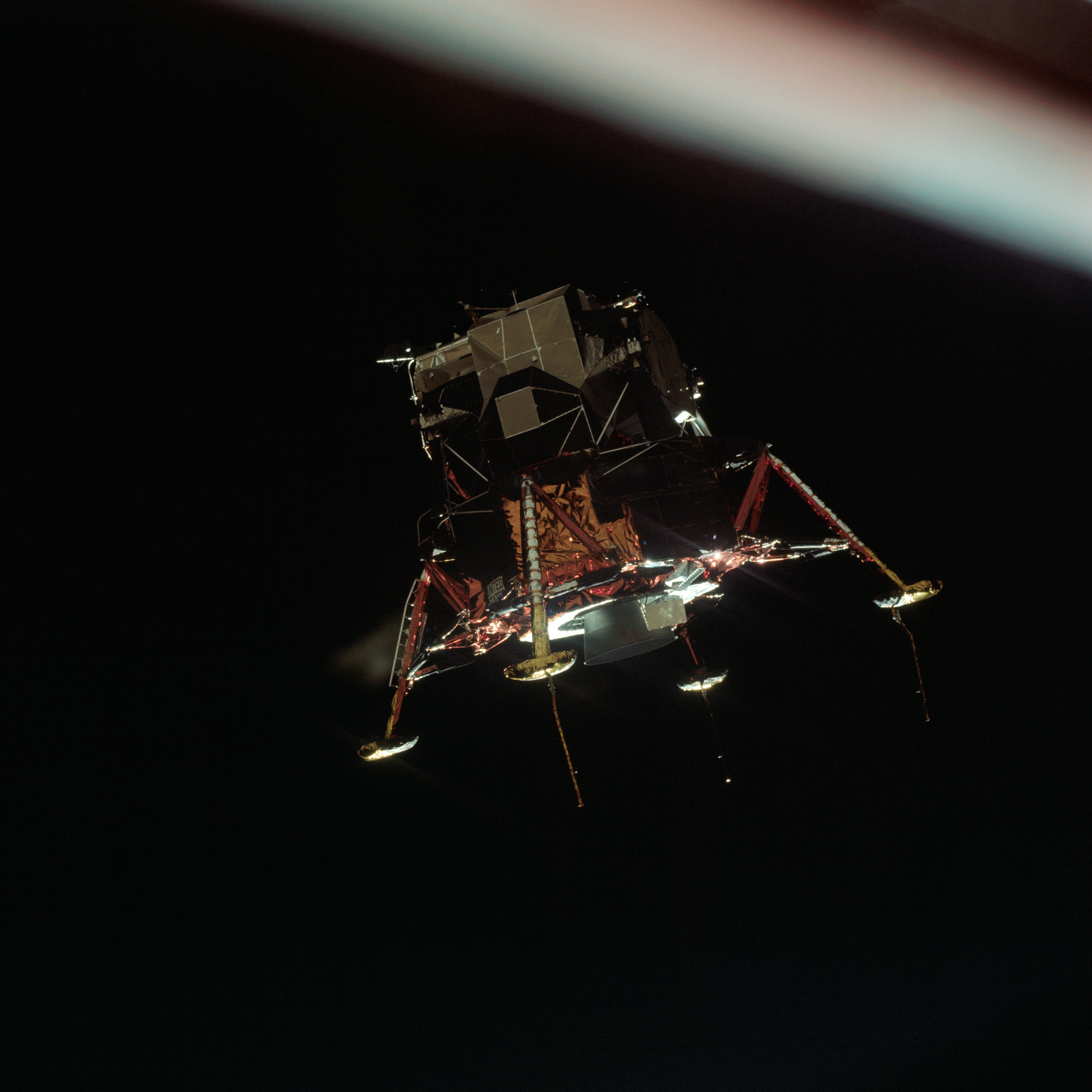
The Apollo 11 Lunar Module with a TRW designed engine

=== Rocket engines ===
TRW designed and built the descent engine or (LMDE) for the Apollo lunar lander. Due to the need for a soft moon landing, it was the first throttleable engine for crewed space flight. This, and the requirements for high thrust, low weight, and crushability, earned praise from NASA, considering the complexity of the lunar missions. This engine was then used on Apollo 13 to achieve free return trajectory and make a minor course correction after damage to the Service Module. After the Apollo program Moon landings, the LMDE was further developed into the TRW TR-201 engine. This engine was used in the second stage Delta-P of the Delta launch vehicle for 77 launches between 1972 and 1988.

== Weapons ==
At the turn of 1964–65, TRW was one of the main companies involved in the development of automatic guns of the Bushmaster program, where, under the leadership of engineer Eugene Stoner, the designer of the famous M16 rifle, a 25 mm automatic cannon was developed under the internal designation TRW model 6425, an ordinary system with automatic gas venting and locking the barrel with a rotary bolt is enough. The result of this program was the creation of a whole series of automatic cannons with an external automatic drive in caliber from 25 to 40 mm, which received their own general name Bushmaster. The TRW-6425 design was later bought by Oerlikon-Bührle, and improved and manufactured as the Oerlikon KBA 25 mm.

== Semiconductors and computers ==
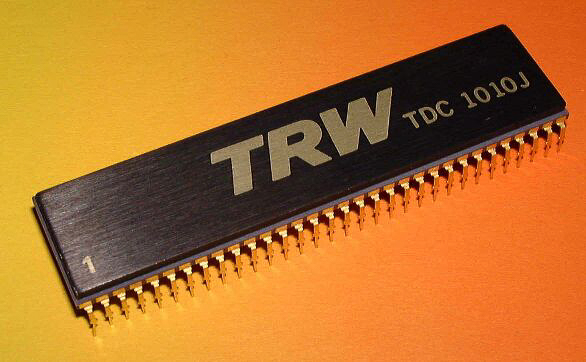
A TRW 1010J parallel multiplier-accumulator

The Ramo-Wooldridge Corp formed Pacific Semiconductors in June 1954, under the leadership of Harper North who had been head of electronics R+D at Hughes Aircraft Company. The funding for this endeavor from Thompson Products was about ten times their initial investment in Ramo-Wooldridge. The original goal was to produce the recently invented transistor for commercial sales.

In 1957, Howard Sachar and Sanford "Sandy" Barnes invented the Varicap electronic component (also known as the varactor diode) at Pacific Semiconductors. This device reduced the physical size of radio tuners and eliminated the need for moving mechanical parts. This simplified the implementation of remote control TV tuners. Sachar and Barnes were awarded an Emmy in 2007.

The company manufactured the RW-300 for sales in 1959, one of the first "all-transistor" computers with a power supply that used vacuum tubes. The computer was targeted at industrial control applications, with 1024 analog inputs multiplexed to a 1.9K sample/s 10-bit analog-to-digital converter which was transparent to the programmer. It weighed about 600 lb (270 kg). The real-time operating system was written by John Neblett, and was the intellectual precursor of the RSX-11 operating system for the PDP-11.

The TRW-130 computer was introduced in 1961, and designated the AN/UYK-1 by the U.S. Navy as part of its pre-GPS TRANSIT (NAVSAT) satellite-based location system. It used Doppler shifts to compute a location in about 15 minutes, and had rounded corners to allow installation in submarines.

The Transistor Transistor Logic (TTL) logic gate, which was the electronics industry standard for two decades, was invented by TRW's James L. Buie in 1961.

In 1965, engineers Don Nelson and Dick Pick at TRW developed the Generalized Information Retrieval Language and System, for use by the U.S. Army to control the inventory of Cheyenne helicopter parts. This developed into the Pick Database Management System which is still in use as of 2016.

TRW LSI Products, Inc. was a wholly owned subsidiary formed to commercialize the integrated circuit technology the company had developed in support of its aerospace business. They produced some of the first commercially available digital signal processing ICs including the TDC1008 multiplier-accumulator. They also made the first 8-bit flash ADC IC, the TDC1007, resulting in an Emmy Award for analog/digital video conversion technology. TRW also pioneered gallium arsenide (GaAs) chip applications for local multipoint distribution service (LMDS) systems, radios, and satellite communications.

== Audiovisual ==
Bel Canto Stereophonic Recordings, a TRW subsidiary, was a record label active from the mid-1950s to the early 1960s. TRW also owned Bell Sound, which made home and public address audio equipment, Dage Television, manufacturer of television cameras for industrial use and Magnetic Recording Industries, which created the Bell "Record-O-Phone, a tape recorder designed for use in schools.

== In the media ==
Christopher John Boyce was a TRW employee convicted of selling security secrets to the Soviet Union via the Soviet embassy in Mexico City in the mid-1970s. Boyce and his accomplice, Andrew Daulton Lee, were the subjects of the best-selling 1979 Robert Lindsey book The Falcon and the Snowman, and the 1985 film of the same title. Representatives from Space Technology Laboratories (STL) present their ICBM expertise to Don and Pete in Mad Men season 2 episode "The Jet Set".

The Star Trek: The Original Series season 1 episode "Operation -- Annihilate!" (13 April 1967) was filmed on the then-TRW campus (now Northrop Grumman's Space Park) in Redondo Beach, California. The two sets of stairs shown are those leading to the cafeteria of Building S. William Shatner had previously filmed at the TRW campus for the Outer Limits episode "Cold Hands, Warm Heart". Scenes for the 1967 sci-fi film Countdown was filmed at the TRW Space Park.

The TRW building is supposedly one of the credit company buildings demolished in the 1999 film Fight Club. However, there is no TRW building in Delaware, where the demolition purportedly happens. TRW equipment/boxes can be seen stored and being unloaded in the film Close Encounters of the Third Kind during scenes set at Devil's Tower. Bill Gates, the founder of Microsoft, says that he got "his first big break" at age fifteen, debugging energy-grid control software for TRW.

== Awards ==
- 1974 – Nelson P. Jackson Aerospace Award to TRW Systems Group with NASA Ames Research Center for Pioneer 10
- 1978 – Nelson P. Jackson Aerospace Award for HEAO Program
- 1988–1989 – Emmy Award for analog/digital video conversion technology to TRW LSI Products
- 1990 – Goddard Award for Quality and Productivity to Space and Technology Group
- 1992 – Nelson P. Jackson Aerospace Award to Space and Technology Group with NASA for Compton Gamma Ray Observatory
- 1997 – TRW Systems Integration Group receives an award for the successful development, deployment and operation of one of the nation's most vital space systems
- 2001 – Nelson P. Jackson Aerospace Award to TRW Systems Group with NASA Marshall Space Flight Center for Chandra X-ray Observatory
- 2004 – Nelson P. Jackson Aerospace Award to Northrop Grumman (formerly TRW) Space Technology Sector with NASA Goddard Space Flight Center for TDRSS
- 2007 – Emmy Award for Varicap to Sycom (formerly Pacific Semiconductors)

== Superfund site ==
In the 1960s and 1970s, TRW stored trichloroethylene (TCE), a critical chemical for cooling and degreasing computer chips and for household cleaners, in underground tanks in Sunnyvale, California. As a result of gradual pipe and tank degradation, the tanks leaked into the ground, resulting in contaminated soil and groundwater. TCE was later determined to be toxic at high concentrations, and in 2013, The Atlantic referred to the site as a "paved-over environmental disaster zone".

The site TRW (now Northrop Grumman) was responsible for was called the 'TRW Microwave site', and was designated as a United States Superfund Site. The United States Environmental Protection Agency (EPA) worked with TRW to treat the water with ultraviolet light and oxygenation and excavate the contaminated soil. In 1994, a public health study determined that the groundwater was still unacceptably contaminated and could cause vapor intrusion. In the 2000s, a bioremediation method developed by Stanford University using bacteria in molasses to naturally breakdown TCE into harmless sub-compounds was implemented. Other measures included engineering vapor pathways to avoid direct human contact by releasing it into the air. Jared Blumenfeld, the former EPA director, said that TCE released in the air after the cleanup efforts reduces the concentrations to levels that eliminate health risks. Blumenfeld said that airborne TCE is not ideal, but the cleanup has reduced the toxins by 90% as of 2013, according to Max Shahbacian, the project's lead at California State Water Resources Control Board before it was transferred to the EPA, and geologist Michael Calhoun.

In 2014 and 2015, a newly required vapor intrusion test of the surrounding residential area, including homes, apartment buildings, and four schools, showed unacceptable levels of TCE. A 2011 study had revealed TCE caused birth defects and cancer by all pathways of exposure. In 2014, the region's congressional representative Anna Eshoo expressed concerns that the EPA had not been properly monitoring the site and notififying residents of a possible health issue. The EPA litigated with the responsible parties in order update its notification and testing measures to warn residents about possible exposure as early as possible and keeping people away from any unsafe areas.

As of 2016, the site is owned by GI Partners, an investment company, and has been leased by Apple Inc. since 2015 for research and development as of 2021. The octagonal glass building was renovated in 2014 and made available for occupancy in 2015. The safety of the site was verified by the EPA. In 2016, the Donald Trump administration cut funding the Superfund program by $330 million and EPA funding by more than 30%, resulting in a significant reduction in enforcement and testing. During his presidency, the EPA increased its use of consent decrees, or administrative settlements, to ensure progress continued under the budget cuts, forcing responsible parties to pay for the cleanup. Scott Pruitt, Trump's head of the EPA threatened to cut budgets again for the enforcement. In 2019, the EPA and Philips Semiconductors agreed to a consent decree, with Northrop Grumman as a signatory, to fund the remaining cleanup and monitoring of the site, along with two nearby sites collectively known as the "Triple Site".

In March 2021, Ashley Gjøvik, a former Apple program manager, publicized concerns that the site had not been properly tested since 2015 after receiving an email from Apple notifying employees of forthcoming vapor intrusion testing. An EPA study in 2019 had confirmed the previous remedies effective, but Gjøvik told TechCrunch cracks in the floor were exposing employees to carcinogenic fumes. She filed a whistleblower complaint with the Occupational Safety and Health Administration against Apple, which was investigated and dismissed. A site evaluation by the EPA done in August 2021 found that the likelihood for vapor intrusion was low and not expected. Based on field testing done between April 24, 2023, and May 5, 2023, the EPA concluded that vapor intrusion was being prevented.

== See also ==
- List of Superfund sites in California
- Semiconductor industry
- History of personal computers
