= Teapot Committee =

1958 group to study US strategic missiles

Teapot Committee was codename for the Strategic Missile Evaluation Committee, whose purpose was to evaluate strategic missiles of the U.S. Air Force.

== Establishment ==
In October 1953, the Assistant Secretary of the U.S. Air Force for Research and Development Trevor Gardner established the committee to study strategic missiles including the Snark, Navaho, and Atlas, all of which were Air Force projects. Gardner recruited eleven of the nation's leading scientists and engineers: Dr. John von Neumann served as chairman, and the Ramo-Wooldridge Corporation (forerunner of TRW) was hired to administer the committee's work. The founders and chief officers of Ramo-Wooldridge, Simon Ramo and Dean Wooldridge, were also full members of the Teapot Committee. Simon Ramo had known Trevor Gardner since before World War II, when both had worked for General Electric at Schenectady, New York. After the war, Ramo joined Hughes Aircraft as head of electronics research and eventually rose to the position of Director of Guided Missile Research and Development; both Ramo and Dean Wooldridge had gained acclaim for their work on the Air Force's Falcon missile. Ramo had become Director of Operations and Executive Vice President when he and Wooldridge, in September 1953, left Hughes to form their own company.

Other members of the Teapot Committee were Clark Blanchard Millikan, Charles C. Lauritsen, and Louis Dunn (all of Caltech); Hendrik Wade Bode (Bell Telephone Labs); Allen E. Puckett (Hughes Aircraft); George Kistiakowsky (Harvard); Jerome B. Wiesner (MIT); and Lawrence A. Hyland (Bendix Aviation). The committee's military liaison was Colonel Bernard A. Schriever, the Air Staff's Assistant for Development Planning and a brigadier general selectee.

== Deliberations ==
Meeting first in November and twice more afterward, the Teapot Committee rendered its report on February 10, 1954. Originally, the Teapot Committee had favored eliminating the Snark, but in its report recommended only that the Snark's guidance system be simplified and that development continue. Members contended that Snark's primary usefulness was as a decoy for the crewed bomber force. Similarly, the Teapot Committee was not enthusiastic about the Navaho as a strategic weapon because of the inadequacies of ramjets. Nonetheless, the committee supported continued research in certain technological areas, especially in the propulsion systems, in which the Navaho project provided direct benefit for ICBM development.

The Teapot Committee centered its attention on the feasibility of developing the major subsystems for the Atlas-that is, propulsion, guidance, airframe, and warhead. Given the reported Soviet lead in intercontinental ballistic missiles and the countervailing advantage offered by the American nuclear breakthrough, the committee concluded that it was imperative to accelerate Atlas development. However, the speed up and early delivery of the Atlas ICBM could be accomplished only by embarking on a "crash program" that would include changing drastically the missile's specifications and creating an entirely new management organization. In its summary, the Teapot Committee called for a "radical reorganization of the . . . project considerably transcending the [existing] Convair framework."

Foremost among the committee's recommendations to accelerate the ICBM program, was the call to revise the Atlas's requirements in conformity with the new realities created as a result of the thermonuclear breakthrough. The promise of lighter, higher-yield weapons was later confirmed during the Operation Castle nuclear test series, that began in March 1954. As a result, the stringent 1,500-foot (460 m) accuracy requirement for Atlas was reduced to between 2 and 3 nautical miles (5.6 km). This revision would also permit slashing the missile's weight and diameter. As a further benefit, the lower accuracy requirement eased the Atlas's guidance problem and prompted an investigation of an advanced, on board, all-inertial guidance system.

In the management area, Committee had questioned the contractor's ability to complete the Atlas work, based on Convair's current development approach and the competence of its scientific and engineering staff. Further, members recommended that the Air Force undertake a thorough review of up to a year, if necessary, to determine how best to achieve the earliest possible operational capability. Pending such a review, the Air Force should curtail all production of full-scale flight test vehicles and detailed design of the guidance system. On the other hand, the committee members encouraged continuing basic research in guidance systems, North American Aviation's rocket propulsion work, and the preparation of instrument flight test facilities.

At last, the Report concluded that the Atlas program could be accelerated only if it was entrusted to "an unusually competent group of scientists and engineers capable of making systems analyses, supervising the research phases and completely controlling the experimental and hardware phases of the program." Unfortunately, no single company currently employed persons of that caliber; they would have to be recruited from among several industry, university, and government organizations. Looking ahead, the committee also noted that this proposed new development-management group would have to be free "of excessive detailed regulation by government agencies."

Finally, the Committee believed that, if it was assigned such a crash basis priority, the Air Force could obtain an operational Atlas ICBM in 6 to 8 years-that is, sometime between 1960 and 1962.

The Committee recommendations nearly duplicated those of a Rand Corporation study issued two days earlier, on February 8, 1954. The Rand study, headed by Dr. Bruno W. Augustein, was begun in September 1953 for the purpose of finding ways to accelerate ICBM development. Not surprisingly, then, the Teapot Committee used and based much of its findings on Rand data. In connection with these studies, Trevor Gardner advised Assistant Secretary Donald A. Quarles that an emergency operational capability could be attained as early as 1958, if enough money and priority were provided. Gardner meant that, in an emergency, contractor engineers in lieu of Air Force personnel could launch the Atlas. Gardner's claim was facetiously dubbed a "PhD" type capability.
