= Bernard Schriever =

United States Air Force general

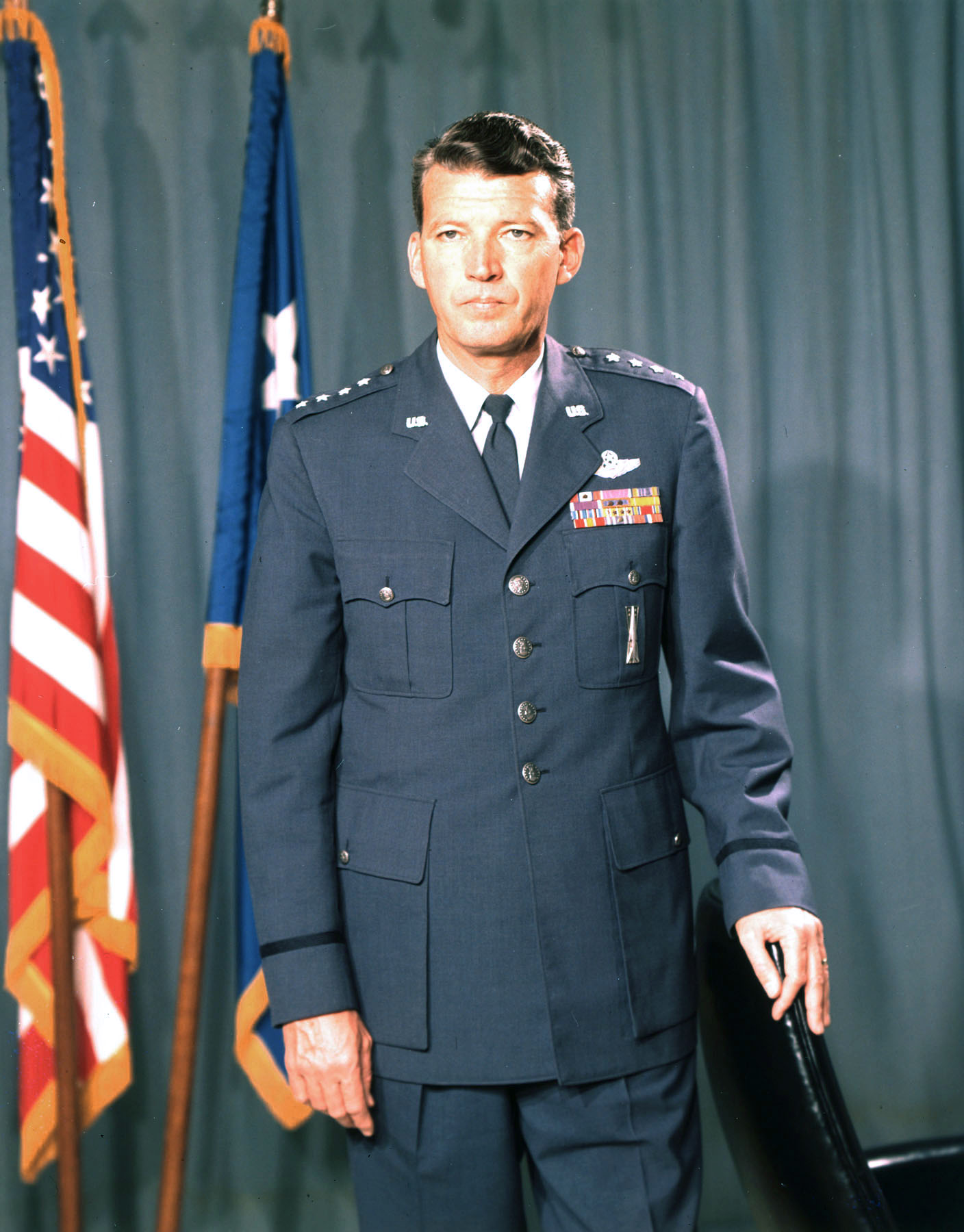
- Born: Bernard Adolph Schriever; 14 September 1910; Bremen, German Empire
- Died: 20 June 2005 (aged 94); Washington, D.C., United States
- Burial place: Arlington National Cemetery
- Spouses: Dora Devol Brett (d.2001) (m. 1938; div. 1997) Joni James (m. 1997)
- Children: 3
- Military career
- Allegiance: United States
- Branch: United States Army (1931–1947); United States Air Force (1947–1966)
- Service years: 1931–1966
- Rank: General
- Nicknames: Ben, Bennie
- Service number: 0-21536
- Commands: Western Development Division; Air Research and Development Command; Air Force Systems Command
- Conflicts: World War II: New Guinea campaign; Philippines Campaign (1944–45)
- Awards: Army Distinguished Service Medal; Air Force Distinguished Service Medal; Legion of Merit (2)

Bernard Adolph "Bennie" Schriever (14 September 1910 – 20 June 2005) was a United States Air Force general who played a major role in the Air Force's space and ballistic missile programs.

Born in Bremen, Germany, Schriever immigrated to the United States as a boy and became a naturalized US citizen in 1923. He graduated from Texas A&M in 1931, and was commissioned as a reserve second lieutenant in the U.S. Army. He transferred to the United States Army Air Corps and was awarded his wings and a commission as a reservist second lieutenant in 1933. In 1937, he was released from active duty at his own request and became a pilot with Northwest Airlines, but he returned to the Air Corps with a regular commission in 1938.

During World War II, Schriever received a Master of Arts in aeronautical engineering from Stanford University in June 1942, and was sent to the Southwest Pacific Area, where he flew combat missions as a bomber pilot with the 19th Bombardment Group until it returned to the United States in 1943. He remained in Australia as chief of the maintenance and engineering division of the Fifth Air Force Service Command until the end of the war. After the war, Schriever joined the United States Army Air Forces (USAAF) headquarters at the Pentagon as chief of the Scientific Liaison Branch in the office of the Deputy Chief of Staff for Materiel.

In 1954, Schriever became head of the Western Development Division (WDD), a special agency created to manage the intercontinental ballistic missile (ICBM) development effort. There he directed the development of the Atlas, Thor, Titan and Minuteman missiles. In 1959, he became commander of Air Research and Development Command (ARDC), and in 1961, of the Air Force Systems Command. He retired in 1966.

== Early life ==
Bernard Adolph Schriever was born in Bremen, Germany, on 14 September 1910, the son of Adolf Schriever, a mariner, and his wife Elizabeth née Milch. He had a younger brother, Gerhard. His father was an engineering officer on the SS George Washington, a German ocean liner which was interned in New York Harbor on the outbreak of World War I in August 1914. Germany was not yet at war with the United States, so Schriever's mother was able to obtain passage to New York for herself and her two sons aboard a Dutch liner, SS Noordam, so that the family could be reunited. She spoke English fluently, having lived in Lower Manhattan as a girl, but the two boys could only speak German. The family arrived on 1 February 1917, just two months before the United States declared war on Germany.

As a wave of anti-German sentiment swept across the United States, Schriever and his family moved to New Braunfels, Texas, a community with a large German-speaking population, where his father found work in a brewery. Schriever and his brother went to school there. Classes were taught in English, but their learning was facilitated by the ability of their teachers to translate for them. The family then moved to San Antonio, Texas, where his father worked in a factory making gasoline engines. His father died on 17 September 1918, as a result of an industrial accident, leaving Schriever and his brother in the care of his great uncle, Magnus Klattenhoff, a rancher in Slaton, Texas. At this time, Schriever acquired the nickname, Ben, while his brother Gerhard became known as Gerry. After a year, they returned to New Braunfels, where their mother placed them in an orphanage so she could work.

His mother found work as a housekeeper for a wealthy banker, Edward Chandler, supervising the half dozen or so staff that worked in his mansion. She managed to earn enough money working to take the boys back from the orphanage. Chandler built her a house near the twelfth hole of the Brackenridge Park Golf Course in San Antonio, and her mother immigrated from Germany to care for the boys while she worked. After Chandler died, Schriever's mother turned the refreshment stand that he had built for the children into a thriving business that sold sandwiches, cookies, lemonade, and soft drinks to golfers. The boys became proficient at the sport, and Schriever made the semifinals of the Texas junior championships in June 1927, winning a pair of golf shoes.

Schriever became a naturalized US citizen in 1923. He entered the Agricultural and Mechanical College of Texas (Texas A&M) in 1927. His mother paid his $1,000 annual tuition from her sandwich stand profits. He was captain of the golf team in his senior year, and in 1931, the year he graduated with a Bachelor of Science degree in structural engineering, he won the Texas junior state championship and the San Antonio city championship. He was offered a position as a professional golf player in Bryan, Texas, at a salary of $2,400 a year (equivalent to $50,810 in 2025), more than he could earn doing anything else during the Great Depression years, but professional golf did not have the social respectability or the prize money that it carries today, and he turned it down.

== Between the wars ==
At Texas A&M in those days, the entire all-male student body served in the college's Corps of Cadets and hence the Reserve Officers' Training Corps (ROTC). Schriever served in an artillery battery in the Corps, so upon graduation he received a reservist commission as a second lieutenant in the Field Artillery Branch. He applied for flight training, and on 1 July 1932, he reported to Randolph Field in San Antonio. He completed this successfully and went on to advanced training at Kelly Field. He graduated on 29 June 1933, and was awarded his wings and a commission as a reservist second lieutenant in the United States Army Air Corps. Soon after he was promoted to first lieutenant.

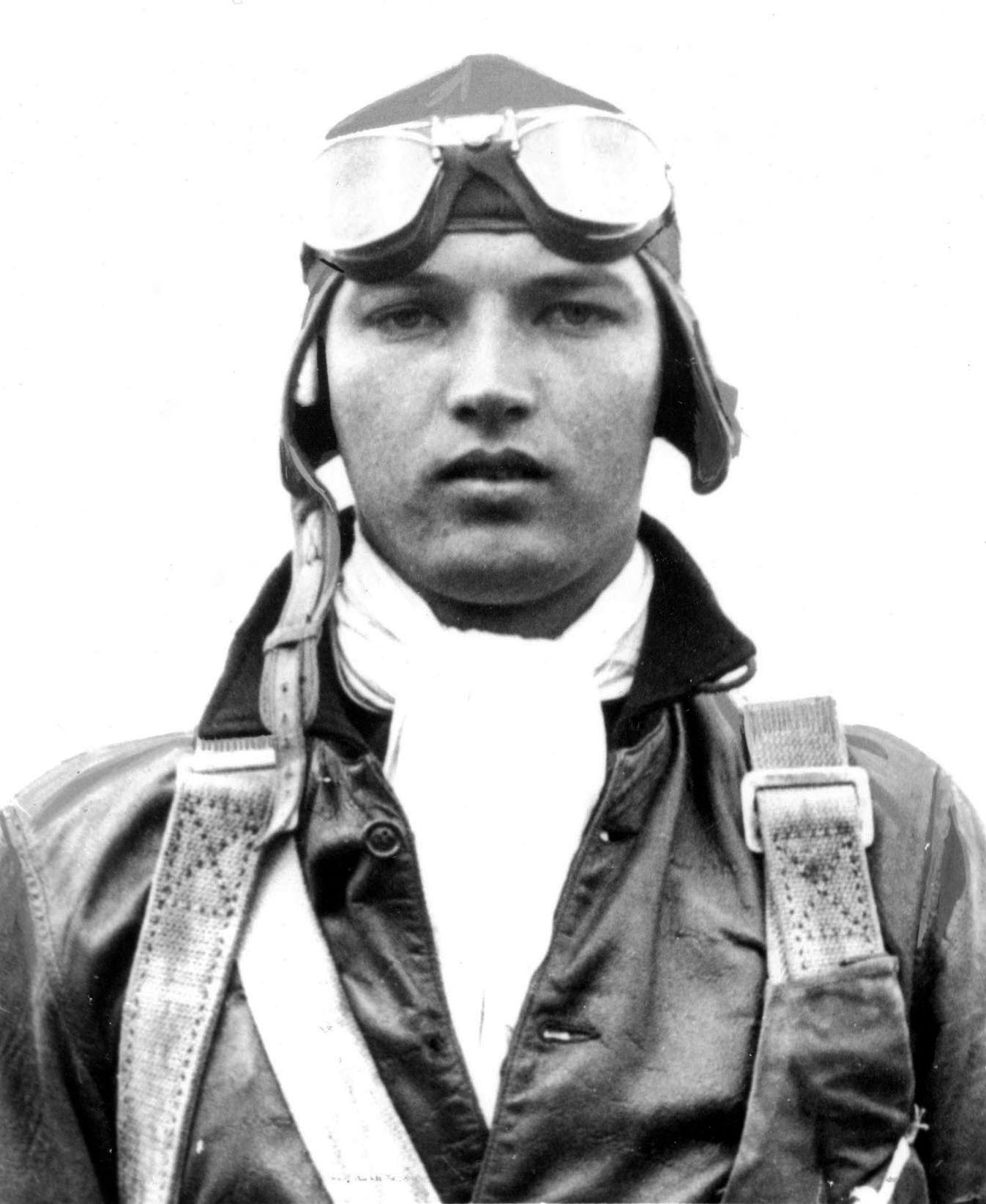
As a young pilot in the 1930s

Schriever's first posting was to March Field in Riverside County, California, where Lieutenant Colonel Henry H. Arnold was the base commander. Schriever was joined there by his mother and brother. His mother had lost her savings when her bank closed and his brother quit Texas A&M in his sophomore year when she could no longer pay his tuition. At Riverside she became good friends with Arnold's wife Eleanor, known as Bee. Most Air Corps officers worked only half a day, leaving plenty of time for sports. Schriever won a couple of golf tournaments at the nearby Victoria Country Club in Riverside.

However, in the wake of the Air Mail scandal, President Franklin D. Roosevelt called on the Air Corps to deliver the mail, and Schriever flew mail deliveries in Douglas O-38 and Keystone B-4 aircraft. It was dangerous work in bad weather, as neither aircraft was equipped for instrument flying. The air mail delivery allowed Schriever to extend his active service by eight months, but he was still a reservist. He left active duty in March 1935 and returned to San Antonio. In June he volunteered to direct a Civilian Conservation Corps camp of about 200 teenage youths. He applied for a regular commission, but was unsuccessful.

Schriever was able to return to active duty in October 1936, but he had to revert to the rank of second lieutenant. This time he was posted to Albrook Field in the Panama Canal Zone. The base commander there was Brigadier General George H. Brett. Word of Schriever's prowess at golf had reached Panama, and Brett asked him to become one of his aides-de-camp in the hope of improving his own game. Schriever accepted; it was a good career opportunity, and it paid an extra $10 a month. In 1937, he met and courted Brett's eldest daughter, Dora Devol Brett. He again applied for a regular commission, and once again was turned down.

In August 1937, Schriever was released from active duty at his own request, and became a pilot with Northwest Airlines, flying a Lockheed Model 10 Electra between Seattle and Billings, Montana. He married Dora in a ceremony at Arnold's house in Washington, DC, on 3 January 1938. They would later name their first child Brett Arnold. Brett was born in 1939. Two more children followed: Dodie Elizabeth in 1941 and Barbara Alice in 1949. Later that year Arnold, now a brigadier general, came out to Seattle to meet with Boeing executives, and he played a round of golf with Schriever and two others. Arnold urged Schriever to apply for a regular commission one more time, because war was approaching and skilled pilots were needed. Schriever did so, although it meant a cut in pay and reverting to the rank of second lieutenant. This time he was successful, and became a regular officer on 1 October 1938.

== World War II ==
Schriever was assigned to Hamilton Field, California, as a Douglas B-18 Bolo instrument flying instructor with the 7th Bombardment Group. The following year Brett, now the head of the Materiel Division had Schriever transferred to Wright Field, Ohio, where Brett had his headquarters, as an engineering officer and test pilot. Schriever had told his father in law of his ambition to attend the Air Corps Engineering School there, and Brett arranged for Schriever to enter in July 1940. He graduated from it in July 1941, and received a Master of Arts in aeronautical engineering from Stanford University in June 1942, also receiving a promotion to the rank of major.

Although Schriever had requested to be transferred to a combat zone after the bombing of Pearl Harbor launched the US into World War II, his request was not approved until after his studies were completed. In July 1942 he was assigned as a bomber pilot to the 19th Bombardment Group in the Southwest Pacific Area, where Brett, now a lieutenant general, was in command of the Allied Air Forces. He flew ten combat missions with the 19th Bombardment Group before it returned to the United States in 1943; around this time he received the Purple Heart. Schriever remained behind as chief of the maintenance and engineering division of the Fifth Air Force Service Command. He was promoted to lieutenant colonel in March 1943, and in August became chief of staff of the Fifth Air Force Service Command. He was promoted to colonel on 21 December 1943. For his services, he was awarded the Army Distinguished Service Medal and the Legion of Merit.

== Post-war ==
=== Aircraft ===
After the war ended, Schriever returned to the United States on 24 September 1945. In January 1946, he joined the United States Army Air Forces (USAAF) headquarters at the Pentagon as chief of the Scientific Liaison Branch in the office of the Deputy Chief of Staff for Materiel. He worked closely with the USAAF Scientific Advisory Board, which was headed by Theodore von Kármán. He was serving there when the United States Air Force (USAF) became independent from the Army in July 1947. In July 1949, Schriever entered the National War College. He became known for complaining that there was "too much polishing of doorknobs instead of putting new technology to work."

On graduating the following year, he expected to receive a field command, perhaps Vice Commander of the Air Proving Grounds at Eglin Air Force Base in Florida, but instead returned to the Pentagon as Deputy Assistant for Evaluation under the newly created Deputy Chief of Staff for Development. His office, which performed or contracted for analytical work, was renamed the Development Planning Office in January 1951. He became an advocate of increased research and development, and instituted a systems engineering approach to the introduction of new technology. He instituted a system of Development Planning Objectives (DPOs) that attempted to match promising new technologies with major Air Force missions rather than merely attempting to improve existing capabilities. To formulate his DPOs, Schriever turned to the Scientific Advisory Board, RAND Corporation and outside consultants from industry and academia for help.

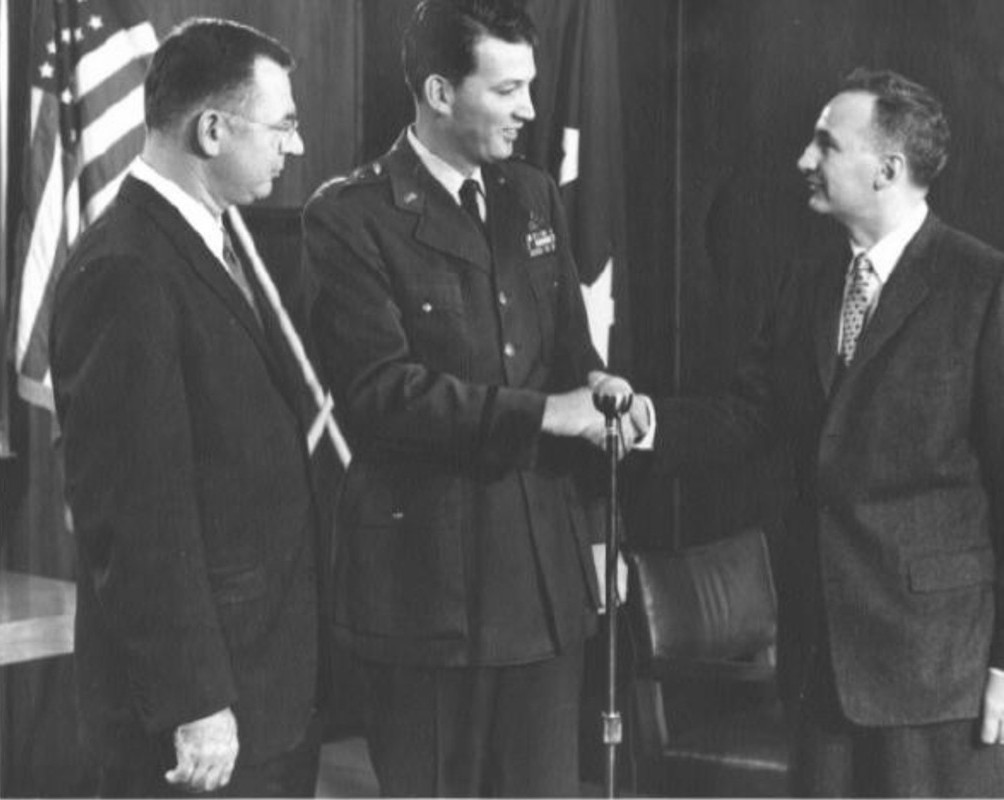
Schriever (center) with Trevor Gardner (left) and Simon Ramo (right)

Schriever clashed repeatedly with General Curtis LeMay of the Strategic Air Command (SAC). One disagreement was over the Aircraft Nuclear Propulsion project. LeMay wanted a supersonic bomber, but the scientists and engineers kept telling Schriever that only a subsonic one was possible. At LeMay's insistence, the project continued until it was cancelled by President John F. Kennedy in 1961. When Schriever proposed extending the life of the USAF's Boeing B-47 Stratojets by strengthening the wings and cutting back on production of the new Boeing B-52 Stratofortress, thereby saving billions of dollars, LeMay flew into a rage. Schriever backed down, and later admitted that LeMay was right; over the years the B-52 proved to be the better investment.

When Schriever forecast that the Soviet Union might develop surface-to-air missiles that could shoot down high-flying bombers and that in the future bombers might have to attack at low level to fly under the radar, LeMay stormed out of Schriever's briefing in disgust. Another walkout occurred in a disagreement over modes of aerial refueling; LeMay supported the adoption of the flying boom method, which was best-suited to bombers, while Schriever supported the probe-and-drogue method, which was more suitable for fighters. LeMay got his way and the USAF standardized on the flying boom.

Inevitably, they disagreed over the specification of a successor to the B-52. LeMay wanted a larger bomber that could carry a heavier bomb load to a higher altitude with longer range and supersonic speed. Schriever thought that the increase in altitude and speed would not save it from surface-to-air missiles. A compromise resulted in the development of the Convair B-58 Hustler, a supersonic high-altitude medium bomber that satisfied neither.

Schriever was promoted to brigadier general on 23 June 1953. LeMay tried to have him sent to South Korea to command the logistics units of the Fifth Air Force. Lieutenant General Earle E. Partridge, the former head of the Air Research and Development Command (ARDC) and now the Deputy Chief of Staff for Operations, and Lieutenant General Donald L. Putt, Partridge's successor at ARDC, intervened, taking the matter up with the new Air Force Chief of Staff, General Nathan Twining, and his Vice Chief of Staff, General Thomas D. White, and the orders were cancelled.

=== Missiles ===
In March 1953, Schriever attended a meeting of the Scientific Advisory Board at Maxwell Air Force Base in Alabama. The United States had only recently conducted Ivy Mike, its first hydrogen bomb test, on 1 November 1952. The Ivy Mike device had weighed 82 short tons (74 t), but at the meeting two of the board members, John von Neumann and Edward Teller, predicted that by 1960 a hydrogen bomb could be built that weighed just 1 short ton (0.91 t) but with the explosive power of 10 megatons of TNT (42 PJ). The strategic implications of this were obvious to Schriever: an intercontinental ballistic missile (ICBM) could be built to deliver hydrogen bombs. The low weight meant that the missile would not have to be impractically large, and the reasonably high yield meant that it did not need to be impractically accurate.

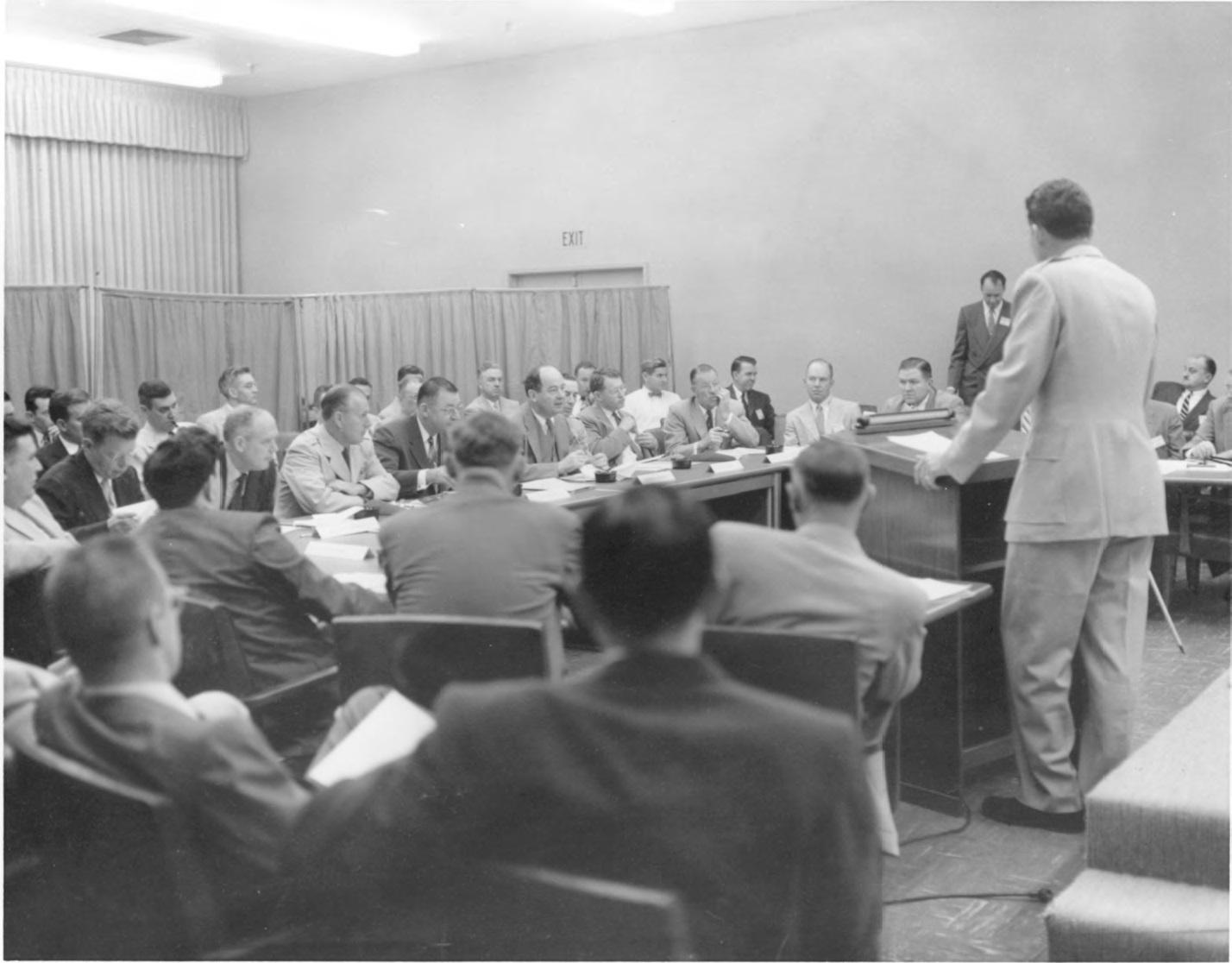
Schriever addressed a session of the Scientific Advisory Board in 1955. In the front row (left to right) are George McRae, Charles Lindbergh, Thomas S. Power, Trevor Gardner, John von Neumann, Harold Norton, Guyford Stever and Clark Millikan

The USAF had an ICBM project initially known as Project MX-1593 running since January 1951. It became Project Atlas in August 1951. Atlas was expected to weigh 440,000 pounds (200,000 kg), and deliver a 3,000-pound (1,400 kg) nuclear warhead within 1,500 feet (460 m) of the target. If the warhead weight could be cut to 1,500 pounds (680 kg), the weight of the launch vehicle could be halved. On his own initiative, Schriever went to see von Neumann at the Institute for Advanced Study on 8 May 1953. Von Neumann explained the process by which smaller and lighter hydrogen bombs of lesser yield would be developed in the future, and Schriever left the meeting convinced.

Schriever found an ally in the incoming Eisenhower administration in Trevor Gardner, the Secretary of the Air Force's special assistant for research and development. In October 1953 Gardner created the Teapot Committee to review the USAF's strategic missile projects. In its report, which it rendered on 10 February 1954, it recommended a crash program that would produce a deployable ICBM in six to eight years. On 14 May 1954, White gave Project Atlas the highest Air Force development priority, and directed the new ARDC commander, Lieutenant General Thomas S. Power, to accelerate the Project Atlas "to the maximum extent that technology would allow".

To steer the project, Gardner created a special Scientific Advisory Committee chaired by von Neumann in April 1954. Its nine members included seven who had served on the Teapot Committee. On 1 July 1954, Power created a special agency, the Western Development Division (WDD), to manage the ICBM development effort. It was initially located in the recently vacated buildings of the St. John Chrysostom School in Inglewood, California, in order to be close to Convair, the prime contractor for Project Atlas. Officers posted there were instructed to wear civilian clothes to disguise the nature of the organization. White initially intended for the WDD to be headed by his special assistant for research and development, Major General James McCormack, but McCormack suffered from health problems, so Schriever succeeded him as White's special assistant and assumed command of the WDD on 2 August 1954.

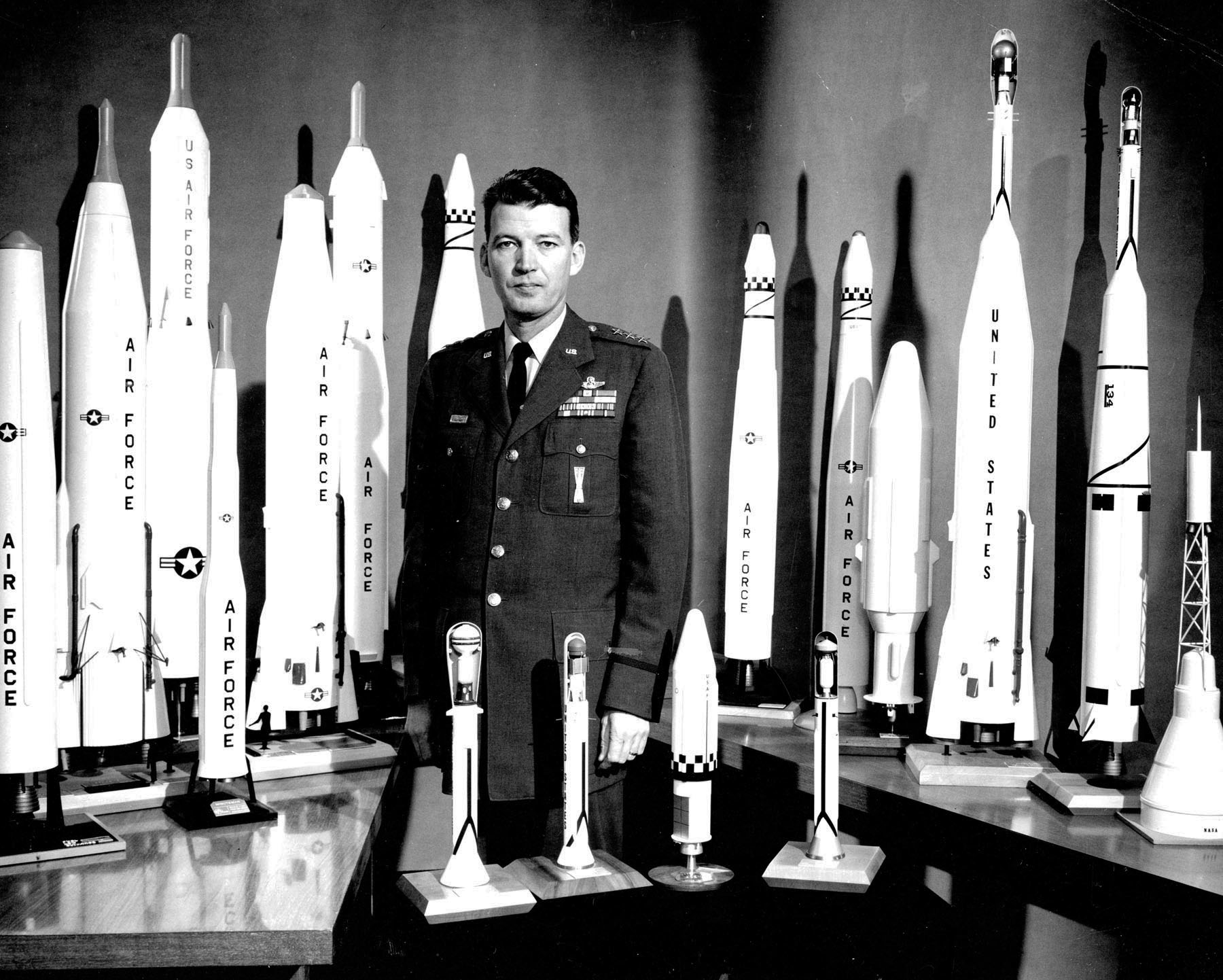
Schriever with models of his missiles

The normal model for management of Air Forces projects was for them to be managed by the airframe manufacturer, with USAF oversight. This was favored by high-ranking Air Force officers and was the model that Schriever initially proposed. It had worked well on aircraft development projects as recently as the B-47 and B-52, but not so well on recent missile projects like Navaho and Snark, which had suffered from long delays and high-cost overruns. The Scientific Advisory Committee did not agree; it felt that the Atlas project was of such a highly scientific and technical nature that a project more like the Manhattan Project was required and that the aircraft industry, with its inflexible work practices, could not attract the required expertise. After consulting with Leslie Groves and Robert Oppenheimer, Schriever came back to the Scientific Advisory Committee with a radical proposal: WDD would manage the project directly, with Ramo-Wooldridge responsible for systems integration; Convair's role would be restricted to manufacturing the fuel tank and body of the missile.

The Scientific Advisory Committee was happy with this proposal, except for Franklin R. Collbohm, the president of RAND. Not so Power, who felt that he was being made responsible for an expensive, high-profile and risky project that would be run by Schriever on the West Coast, where supervision would be difficult. But Power could see that the proposal had high-level support, and was more interested in what was done than how it was done. Schriever's aide, Major Bryce Poe II, was able to convince him to accept the organizational arrangements. Schriever made a point of keeping Power informed with weekly progress reports and frequently travelled to Baltimore to meet with him. When the opportunity arose, he played golf with him. Schriever eventually won Power over, and he recommended Schriever for promotion. Schriever also had to deal with opposition from the president of Convair, Joseph T. McNarney, and his vice president, Thomas George Lanphier Jr.

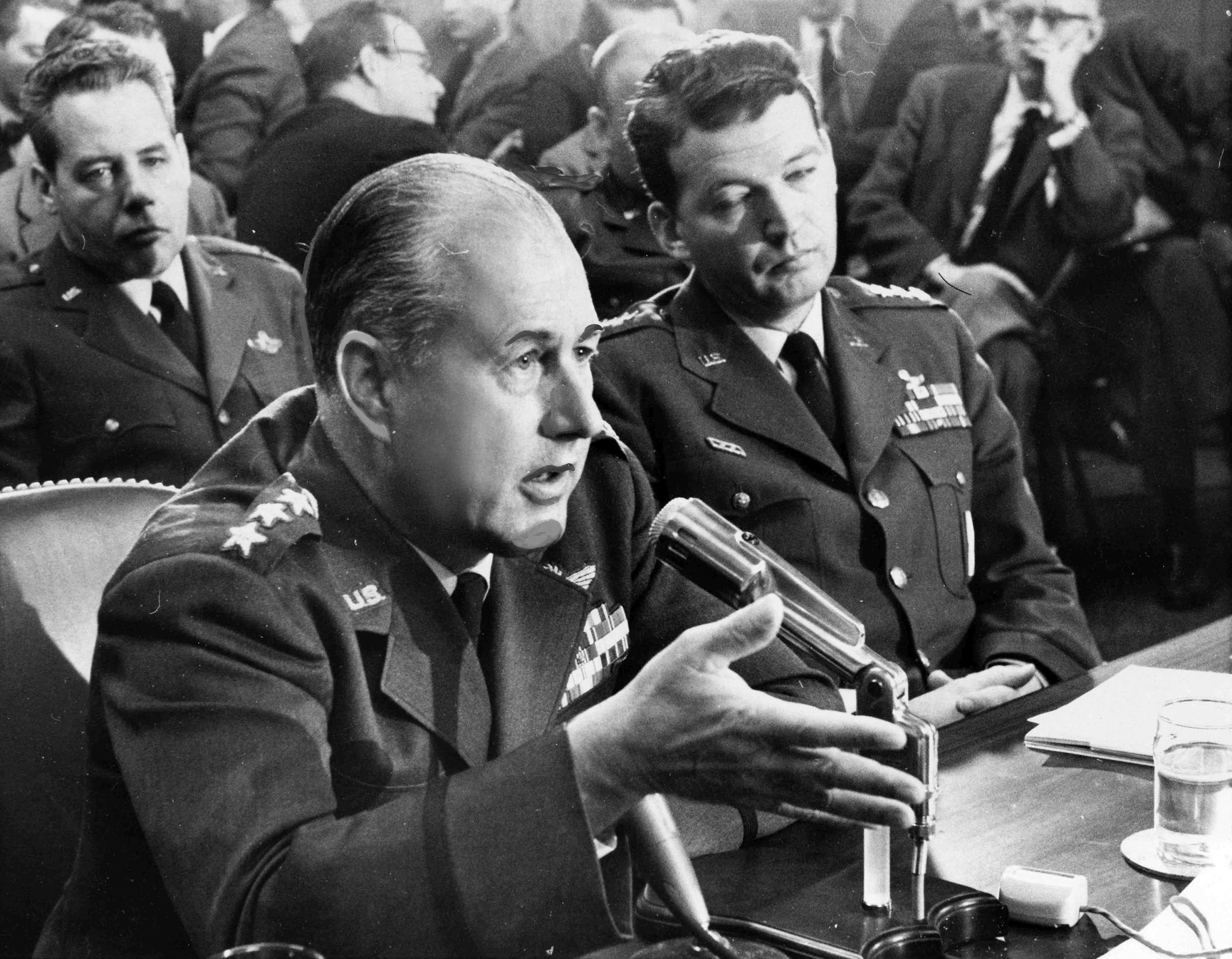
Commander of Air Force System Command General Bernard A. Schriever with Commanders-in-chief of The Strategic Air Command General Thomas S. Power during senate hearing at The Capitol Hill.

On 13 September 1955, President Dwight Eisenhower gave the ICBM program the highest national priority, and Schriever was promoted to major general in December. The number of scientists and engineers working on Atlas rose from 50 in 1955 to 800 in 1956 and 2,000 in 1957. Schriever instituted a system of monthly meetings known as "Black Saturdays". WDD and Ramo-Wooldridge staff would review the project progress, identify problems and assign responsibility for dealing with them. He initially resisted providing cost estimates, but was eventually obliged to do so in November 1956 as project costs rose above the allocated funding. The 1956 budget was $326 million.

In addition to the work on Atlas, the Secretary of the Air Force Harold E. Talbott, authorized a second ICBM project, which became Titan. To avoid conflict with Atlas, all the principal contractors were different. There also arose a requirement for an intermediate-range ballistic missile (IRBM), which became known as Thor. The British government was interested in this kind of missile, but there still were restrictions on exchanging restricted data with the UK. The Air Staff was concerned about potential competition from the Army Ballistic Missile Agency. On 8 November 1955, Secretary of Defense Charles Erwin Wilson ordered both the Army and USAF to proceed with the development of an IRBM, with a priority equal to that of the ICBM but without interfering with it. Thus, Schriever became responsible for three different missile projects. A fourth was added in 1957: Minuteman, a solid-fuel rocket that promised to make the liquid-fueled Atlas and Titan obsolete.

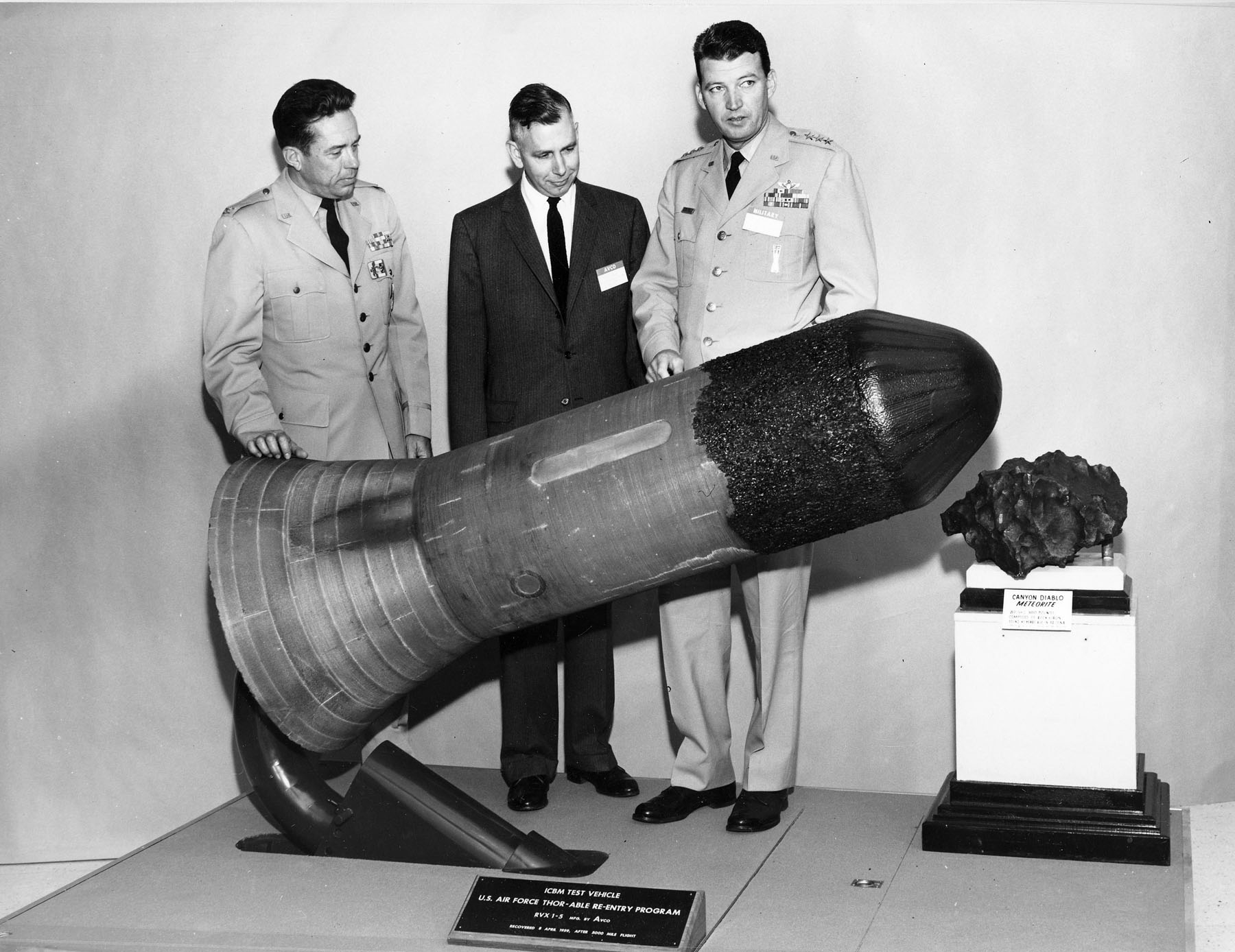
Schriever (right) inspects an experimental missile warhead re-entry vehicle recovered in April 1959 after 5,000 miles (8,000 km)

On 25 September 1957, Major General John Medaris, the head of the ABMA, urged that Thor be cancelled, ostensibly because it did not have 2,000 miles (3,200 km) range. On the next Thor test flight on 24 October 1957, one flew for 3,043 miles (4,897 km). The first Thor arrived in Britain on 29 August 1958. The deployment of Thor missiles to the UK was codenamed Project Emily. On 25 April 1959, Schriever left WDD to succeed Power as commander of ARDC and was promoted to lieutenant general.

USAF research and development activities were split between ARDC and the Air Materiel Command (AMC) until 1 April 1961, when White reorganized them. ARDC became the Air Force Systems Command (AFSC) and all research and development activities were consolidated under it. Schriever became commander of the new organization, one of the responsibilities of which was acquiring missiles. LeMay considered that missiles mainly had political value, and their prime function should be to clear the way for the bombers. After Schriever was promoted to general on 1 July 1961, LeMay looked at his four stars and pointed out that had it been up to him, Schriever "would not have been wearing those".

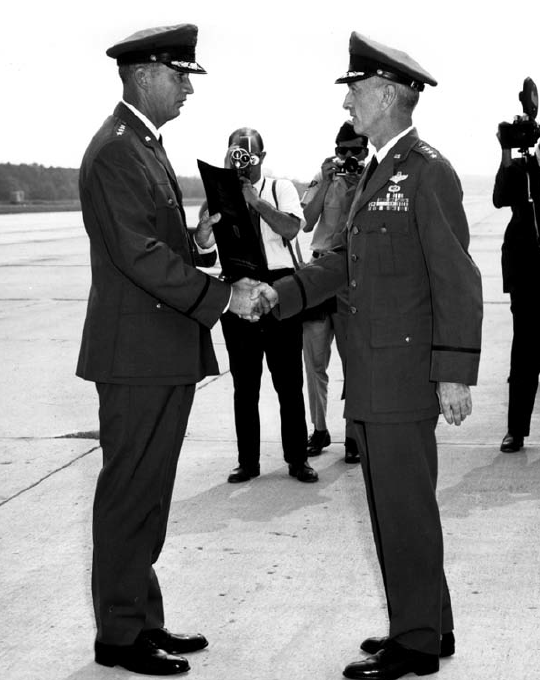
Schriever (left) congratulated by General Bruce K. Holloway, commander-in-chief of the Strategic Air Command, upon Schriever's retirement at Andrews Air Force Base (1966)

The first Atlas missile squadrons became operational on 2 September 1960, with 132 missiles operational by 20 December 1962. Titan deployment began on 18 April 1962, and by 28 September 1962, some 54 Titan missiles were operational, organized as six squadrons of nine missiles each. By 1963, AFSC was employing 27,000 military and 37,000 civilian personnel, and Schriever was responsible for 40 percent of the Air Force budget. Among the projects that he promoted was one for a high-capacity transport aircraft, which became the Lockheed C-5 Galaxy. He hoped to succeed LeMay as Chief of Staff, but when LeMay retired in 1965, the Vietnam War was ramping up, and a combat commander was called for. LeMay was succeeded by General John P. McConnell, and Schriever retired on 31 August 1966, two weeks before his 56th birthday. For his services, he was awarded the Air Force Distinguished Service Medal and the Legion of Merit.

In 1965, Schriever received the Golden Plate Award of the American Academy of Achievement.

In 1966, Schriever was the 1966 recipient of the General William E. Mitchell Memorial Award for his “outstanding contributions to the aerospace science and military posture of the United States.”

== Later years ==
In retirement, Schriever became a consultant to various corporate and government clients. He served on company boards, and was a member of the President's Intelligence Advisory Board under President Ronald Reagan. His marriage deteriorated after 1968 when he began an affair with another woman, and he and his wife separated but did not divorce, as she was a devout Roman Catholic. In 1986, Schriever met the popular singer Joni James. He finally obtained a divorce and they married on 5 October 1997.

In honor of his service, Schriever was inducted into the National Aviation Hall of Fame in 1980. He was awarded the Delmer S. Fahrney Medal in 1982, and on 5 June 1998, Schriever Air Force Base was named for him. In 1997, he was inducted into the International Space Hall of Fame. In 2004, the Space Foundation awarded General Schriever its highest honor, the General James E. Hill Lifetime Space Achievement Award, which is presented annually to recognize outstanding individuals who have distinguished themselves through lifetime contributions to the welfare or betterment of humankind through the exploration, development and use of space, or the use of space technology. In May 2005, General Lance W. Lord, the commander of the Air Force Space Command, presented him with the first Space Operations Badge.

Schriever died at his home in Washington, D.C., on 20 June 2005 at the age of 94 from complications of pneumonia. He is buried at Arlington National Cemetery.

== Awards and decorations ==
During his lengthy and distinguished career, Schriever earned the following decorations:

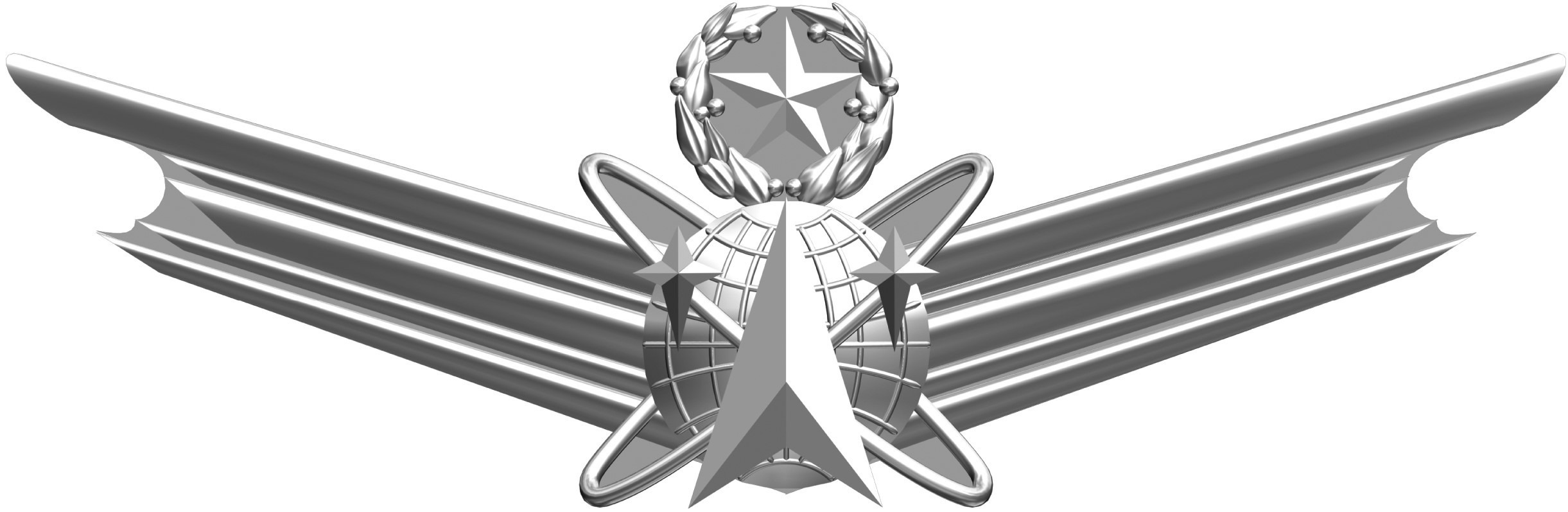

U.S. Air Force Command Pilot Badge
Command Space Operations Badge
Army Distinguished Service Medal with bronze oak leaf cluster (including Air Force Distinguished Service Medal in Army DSM design)
Legion of Merit with bronze oak leaf cluster	Purple Heart	Air Medal
NASA Distinguished Service Medal	Air Force Presidential Unit Citation with two bronze oak leaf clusters	American Defense Service Medal
American Campaign Medal	Asiatic-Pacific Campaign Medal with one silver and three bronze campaign stars	World War II Victory Medal
National Defense Service Medal with service star	Air Force Longevity Service Award with silver oak leaf cluster	Philippine Liberation Medal

U.S. Air Force Missile Badge
