= Bunker Ramo =

American electronics company

Bunker Ramo Corporation
- Final logo before acquisition
- Type: Subsidiary
- Industry: Electronics manufacturing
- Founded: 1964
- Founders: George M. Bunker, Simon Ramo
- Fate: Purchased by AlliedSignal in 1981 and became part of Honeywell
- Products: Military electronics, Digital computers
- Parent: Honeywell

Bunker Ramo Corporation, (Note: Originally hyphenated as Bunker-Ramo Corporation) often shortened to Bunker Ramo, was an American electronics company based in Trumbull, Connecticut. It was founded by George M. Bunker and Simon Ramo in 1964, jointly owned by Martin-Marietta and Thompson Ramo Wooldridge (TRW). The holdings of Teleregister Corporation became part of the new company.

First logo and wordmark

The company became a manufacturer of military electronic devices and digital computers including the transistorized BR-133 of 1964, given the military designation AN/UYK-3. It was a supplier of video display terminals to the financial industry. In 1967, the Amphenol corporation (a manufacturer of electrical connectors) merged with Bunker Ramo. The combined company peaked at number 338 on the Fortune 500 list in 1969.

In February 1971, the firm unveiled the first version of the National Association of Securities Dealers' Automated Quotations system, NASDAQ.

In 1981, it was purchased by Allied Corporation, later AlliedSignal. It is now part of the Honeywell group.

== See also ==
- Joint Electronics Type Designation System – Unclassified designation system for United States military electronic equipment
- List of military electronics of the United States
