= Contracting officer =

A contracting officer (often abbreviated as KO in the US Army or CO in the US Air Force) is a person who can bind the Federal Government of the United States to a contract which is greater in value than the federal micro-purchase threshold ($10,000 for supplies, in most circumstances). This is limited to the scope of authority delegated to the contracting officer by the head of the agency.

== Responsibilities ==
A contracting officer enters into, administers, or terminates contracts and makes related determinations and findings, and is appointed by a (SF) 1402, Certificate of Appointment. Subsection 414(4) of Title 41, United States Code, requires agency heads to establish and maintain a procurement career management program and a system for the selection, appointment, and termination of appointment of contracting officers. Agency heads or their designees may select and appoint contracting officers and terminate their appointments. These selections and appointments shall be consistent with the Office of Management and Budget/Office of Federal Procurement Policy's (OFPP) standards for skill-based training in performing acquisition, contracting and procurement duties as published in OFPP Policy Letter No. 05-01, Developing and Managing the Acquisition Workforce, April 15, 2005.

The responsibilities of a contracting officer are detailed in the FAR (48 CFR) Part 1.602-2: "Contracting officers are responsible for ensuring performance of all necessary actions for effective contracting, ensuring compliance with the terms of the contract, and safeguarding the interests of the United States in its contractual relationships."

== See also ==
- Federal Acquisition Regulation (FAR)
- Contracting Officer's Technical Representative (COTR)
