= Systems Engineering and Technical Assistance =

US Department of Defense contractors

Systems Engineering and Technical Advisory (SETA) contractors are government contractors who are contracted to assist the United States Department of Defense (DoD) components, and acquisition programs. (In some areas of DoD, the acronym SETA refers to "Systems Engineering and Technical Assessment" contractors; also refers to "Systems Engineering and Technical Advisors.") SETA contractors provide analysis and engineering services in a consulting capacity, working closely with the government's own engineering staff members. SETA contractors provide the flexibility and quick availability of expertise without the expense and commitment of sustaining the staff long-term.

== Use of the term ==
SETA is an industry term, which the DoD has used since at least 1995, for example in the Software Engineering Institute; 'Defense Acquisition Deskbook, "S"; the An Acronym List for the Information Age (Armed Forces Communications and Electronics Association); the DoD Guide to Integrated Product and Process Development.

== Contracting ==
The government often needs to supplement its internal Systems Engineering and Technical Advisory capability in order to meet its frequently changing needs and demands. Through a formal Request for Information (RFI)/ Request for Proposal (RFP) process the government is able to contract with a commercial organization to provide certain services. SETA contractors work alongside government employees often within the same workspace. SETA contractors may participate in government contracting actions and may assist in managing other contracts. A SETA contractor cannot be the Contracting Officer's Technical Representative (COTR) or Assistant Contracting Officer Representative (ACOR), but they may function as the Technical Point of Contact (TPOC). Since SETA contractors may have access to procurement sensitive information there is a risk of conflict of interest (CoI) which is mitigated through Non-Disclosure Agreements (NDAs) and firewalls restricting communications within corporations. The SETA support rate in total R&D expenditures of DARPA are evaluating as 7.4-9.9%.

== Policy ==
The policy related to SETA contractors can be found in the Federal Acquisition Regulation (FAR), Defense Federal Acquisition Regulation (DFAR) and DoD Instructions.

FAR Part 37 is the starting point for guidance for these types of contracts. Subpart 37.2 defines advisory and assistance services and provides that the use of such services is a legitimate way to improve the prospects for program or systems success. FAR Part 37.201(c) defines engineering and technical services used in support of a program office during the acquisition cycle. FAR 16.505(c) provides that the ordering period of an advisory and assistance services task order contract, including all options or modifications, may not exceed five years unless a longer period is specifically authorized in a law that is applicable to such a contract. DFARS Part 237 provides information for advisory and assistance contracts. FAR Subpart 9.5 addresses the potential for organizational and consultant conflicts of interest.

Use of SETA contracts and NDAs allows for services involving systems and data and providing assistance and advice. This excludes Inherently Governmental Functions (IGF), as defined in statue by Public Law 105 - Federal Activities Inventory Reform Act (the "FAIR Act") of 1998 and in regulation by OMB Circular A-76.

== See also ==
- Contracting Officer's Technical Representative
- Systems engineering
