= Contracting Officer's Technical Representative =

Liaison role in US government contracting

A Contracting Officer's Technical Representative (COTR) is a business communications liaison between the United States government and a private contractor. The COTR is normally a federal or state employee who is responsible for recommending actions and expenditures for both standard delivery orders and task orders, and those that fall outside of the normal business practices of its supporting contractors and sub-contractors. Most COTRs have experience in the technical area (e.g., electronics, chemistry, public health, etc.) that is critical to the success of translating government requirements into technical requirements that can be included in government acquisition documents for potential contractor to bid and execute that work. A COTR must be designated by a Contracting Officer (CO). The CO has the actual authority to enter into, administer, and/or terminate contracts and make related determinations and findings. Other terms for COTR include Contracting Officer's Representative (COR) and Project Officer (PO). The terminology may be agency specific.

== Responsibilities ==
The Contracting Officer's Technical Representative is responsible for monitoring the contractor's progress in fulfilling the technical requirements specified in the contract. Should the contractor fail to fulfill the contractual requirements, the COTR must inform the CO of such failure. The COTR maintains administration records, approves invoices and performs quarterly monitoring reports to confirm the contractor is meeting the terms and conditions under the contract.

There are limits to the authority delegated to the COTR from the CO. The COTR is not authorized to make any commitments or obligations on behalf of the government, the CO is the only authorized authority that can commit or obligate on behalf of the government. The COTR may not grant the contractor permission to deviate from the requirements stated in the contract, nor direct the contractor to perform any work outside that stated in the contract, these actions can only be done by the CO.

== Training requirements ==
On November 26, 2007 the Office of Management and Budget, issued a memorandum which established a standardized training program for Contracting Officer's Technical Representatives. The program was developed by the Federal Acquisition Institute in coordination with all executive agencies. The program applies to all Technical Representatives except those subject to Defense Acquisition Workforce Improvement Act. All Technical Representatives appointed after November 26, 2007 must be certified no later than six months from their date of appointment. Technical Representatives who received their appointment before November 26, 2007 must ensure that training is obtained, and they are recertified no later than 12 months from the effective date of the memorandum

The COTR must have a minimum of 40 hours of training, including 22 hours of training in essential COTR competencies. The COTR competencies include project management, decision making, market research, problem solving and negotiations. The remaining 18 hours of training should include courses relating to the specific needs of the agency and program office. Once the COTR receives their certification they are required to earn 40 continuous learning points every two years thereafter.

== See also ==
- Federal Acquisition Regulation
- Resource Allocation
- Schedule (project management)
