= Dean Wooldridge =

American aerospace engineer (1913-2006)

Dean Everett Wooldridge (May 30, 1913 in Chickasha, Oklahoma – September 20, 2006 in Santa Barbara, California) was a prominent engineer in the aerospace industry.

Something of a prodigy, Wooldridge graduated from high school at the age of 14. He received his bachelor's and master's degree from the University of Oklahoma. Like his future colleague Simon Ramo, Wooldridge went on to study at the California Institute of Technology under William Smythe, from which he received his PhD in physics (summa cum laude) in 1936, studying the separation of isotopes.

After leaving Caltech, Wooldridge moved first to Bell Laboratories, where he worked on the theory of magnetism. In 1946, he and Simon Ramo (his classmate at Caltech) both became director of research for the electronics department of Hughes Aircraft, and his career became coupled with that of Simon Ramo. Together they formed a successful team for many years, with Wooldridge concentrating on investment and general business aspects while Ramo led research, development and engineering efforts. By 1948, Hughes had created its Aerospace Group to work with the newly created U.S. Air Force. The Air Force became concerned with developing management issues at Hughes, and Ramo and Wooldridge were particularly concerned when Howard Hughes avoided their attempts to discuss the problem. In September 1953, they jointly resigned, and within a week they formed the Ramo-Wooldridge Corporation on September 16, 1953.

In 1958, Ramo-Wooldridge merged with Thompson Products to form TRW, which carried on the success of its predecessor. It handled system engineering and technical direction for numerous Air Force projects. Wooldridge served as president of TRW until he retired in 1962. He returned to Caltech as a research associate and published several books about the physical processes underlying biology and intelligence, winning the AAAS-Westinghouse award for science writing in 1963.

He was a member of the National Academy of Sciences.

He died of pneumonia on September 20, 2006 in Santa Barbara, California.

== Books ==
- The Machinery of the Brain, Dean Wooldridge, McGraw-Hill (1963)
- The Machinery of Life, Dean Wooldridge, McGraw-Hill (1966)
- Mechanical Man: The Physical Basis of Intelligent Life, Dean Wooldridge, McGraw-Hill (1968)
- Sensory Processing in the Brain, Dean Wooldridge, John Wiley & Sons Inc (August 1979), ISBN 0-471-05269-8
