= Trevor Gardner =

American aeronautical engineer (1915-1963)

- Born: August 24, 1915; Cardiff, Wales
- Died: September 28, 1963 (aged 48); Washington, D.C., United States of America
- Military career
- Service years: U.S. Air Force

Trevor Gardner (24 August 1915 - 28 September 1963) was U. S. Assistant Secretary of the Air Force for Research and Development during the early 1950s. Together with Bernard Schriever, the Air Staff's Assistant for Development Planning, Gardner was one of the prime movers of the U.S. ICBM program and was instrumental to the U-2 program.

== Early life and career ==
Gardner was born in Cardiff, Wales, on 24 August 1915. He moved to the United States in 1928 and became a naturalized citizen in 1937. He received a Bachelor of Science degree in engineering from the University of Southern California in 1937. He returned to the University of Southern California to teach freshman mathematics while obtaining his master's degree in business administration which he was awarded in 1939.

== World War II ==
During World War II Gardner's work at the California Institute of Technology focused on rocket and atomic bomb projects for the Office of Scientific Research and Development. With the end of World War II, Gardner became associated with General Tire and Rubber Company of California as general manager and executive vice president. Three years later he left to found Hycon Manufacturing Co., an electronics manufacturer. He was president of Hycon until February 1953 when he became the Secretary of the Air Force's Special Assistant for Research and Development.

== Involvement with ICBM program ==
U.S. President Dwight D. Eisenhower began his first term by initiating a defense policy that sought to significantly reduce spending. Gardner was asked to lead a committee and implement an economy program to reduce missile development activities. Its final report recommended that promising missile projects should be continued. The Atlas, under development since 1951, was America's best hope, however its development had been constrained by the Air Force due to the belief that missiles required too great an investment in systems that seemed "impossible.' "Impatient, Gardner requested a scientific review of all Air Force missile programs in April 1953. The impetus came from two directions. First, he was concerned over the growing Soviet threat and, in August 1953, they exploded a hydrogen bomb. The other trend was the development of lighter nuclear weapons. The "impossible" ICBM was now much more possible. In October 1953 Gardner established a second committee — the Teapot Committee — to review the Air Force's strategic missiles — the Snark, Navaho, and Atlas. He directed the committee to find ways to accelerate the development of the Atlas. The committee issued its report on 10 February 1954. Its thrust called for a "radical reorganization of the ...[Atlas] project considerably transcending the Convair framework" Gardner developed a five-year plan to accelerate the Atlas which would yield a "preliminary capability" by June 1958.

In early 1955 most of the Eisenhower administration assumed that America had a strong lead over the Soviet Union in strategic technology and felt no particular urgency for the ICBM programs. The Killian Report indicated that America was becoming vulnerable and that the ICBM should be given the "highest priority." While an Air Force priority, he believed that ICBMs must also be a national priority. He indicated that the U. S. could have a rudimentary ICBM by mid-1958 if the program was conducted on a crash basis. Eisenhower requested a briefing and, on 28 July 1955, Gardner, von Neumann, and Schriever made a presentation to the President and the National Security Council. As a result, the National Security Council recommended the ICBM be designated a "research program of the highest priority" which the President approved on 13 September 1955. Gardner had achieved his goal.

In January 1955 the Scientific Advisory Committee urged the Air Force to develop a tactical ballistic missile. All three services developed plans and the interservice rivalry led to a compromise with the Air Force building the Thor and the Army and Navy in charge of the Jupiter. Gardner viewed this approach as dangerous since the IRBM could drain resources from the ICBM and threaten its early delivery. His fears were realized when President Eisenhower assigned the ICBM and the IRBM "joint" highest national priority. The ICBM program no longer had a unique status. Trevor Gardner felt betrayed and resigned his position in protest on 10 February 1956.

== Return to public life ==
After the election in 1960 Gardner again became active in public life. He served on the President's Space Task Force Commission to review the nation's space program and also chaired the U.S. Air Force Space Task Force. He also became involved in preventing the use of weapons. Gardner played a major role in establishing the U. S. Arms Control and Disarmament Agency and was named to its General Advisory Commission on 1 March 1962. At the time of his death on 28 September 1963 in his home in Washington, D.C., Gardner was actively participating in Project Forecast, which was to chart the future course of the Air Force for the next decade. Gardner died on 28 September 1963.

Gardner was honored by the U.S. Air Force as an Air Force Space and Missile Pioneer in 1997.

== See also ==
- Teapot Committee
