= Switched reluctance linear motor =

Type of linear motor

Switched reluctance linear motors (SRLMs) (also known as linear switched reluctance motors (LSRMs), variable reluctance linear motor or switched reluctance linear machines) are a type of electric machines called linear motors which work based on the principle of a varying magnetic reluctance for force generation. The system can be used in reversed mode and then is called Switched Reluctance Linear Generator. The SRLMs consist of two parts: the active part or primary part and the passive or secondary. The active part contains the windings and defines two main types of LSRMs: transverse and longitudinal. It is longitudinal when the plane that contains the flux lines is parallel to the line of movement and transverse when it is perpendicular. Other classifications are considering the windings totally concentrated in one coil per phase or partially concentrated in two poles per phase (i.e., single-sided) or four poles per phase (double-sided). Switched Reluctance motors have been used extensively in clocks and phonograph turntables before, but nowadays, with the rising emphasis on energy efficiency, SR motors are taking more prominent roles in appliances, industrial uses, and commercial and vehicular applications and they are getting traction in the linear applications due to their simplicity, robustness, economic rationality, and high fault tolerance ability as compared with the Linear Synchronous and Linear Induction motors. The SRLM has been researched widely and there are applications of SRLMs and generators for example in wave energy conversion or hyperloop ultra high speed transportation system. One of the main advantages of the SRLM is that it does not require the use of permanent magnets, which are considered a scarce material, so it enables it to be deployed over long distances.

== History ==
The first switched reluctance motor was invented all in 1838 by W. H. Taylor in the United States and was initially designed to propel locomotives. Then, in the 1920s, the synchronous reluctance motor was invented. These use a specially designed cageless rotor, eliminating rotor losses, with a magnetic field being generated inside the motor, which is guided through low reluctance paths. The field is rotated, which in turn pulls the rotor around to generate torque. The switched reluctance motor initially suffered from a lack of effective speed control. It was not until the 1970s, with the emergence of fast-switching electronics within variable speed drives (VSDs), that the synchronous reluctance motor was able to finally come into its own and reach performances comparable to that of conventional induction and permanent magnet motors.

The first switched reluctance linear motor ideas date back to the 1970s. In 1973, inventors Hi D Chai and Joseph P Pawletko from International Business Machines Corp patent a "Variable reluctance linear stepper motor". Then a linear stepper motor of the variable reluctance type was for serial printer applications. In 1977 J.W. Finch researcher on the Linear Vernier Reluctance Stepper Motor to replace a mechanical conveyor for a trolley. In 1988-89, Takamaya developed a linear motor based on the principle of variable reluctance. Patent proposals emerge in 1995, where inventors Matsukawa Koji and Saito Jin from Matsushita Electric Works Ltd (Panasonic Electric Works) in relation to an automatic door opening-closing device to reduce the ripple of the driving force. In the XXIst century, the SRLM technology has been validated in on-site pilot projects like the SeaTitan, developed by the Spanish company Wedge Global and thanks to the research carried out by researchers at CIEMAT with a laboratory in Spain to validate the technology.

== Applications ==
The SRLM is particularly suitable for conveyor operation, since its method of operation is such that no relative motion is required for force to be produced. This contrasts with, for example, the linear induction motor, which depends on relative motion between the magnetic field and the conductors in which current is induced for force to be produced. This means that a reluctance motor can be designed to hold indefinitely, if required, at any particular position, before moving on to the next fixed position.

=== Hypertrack - SRLM for hyperloop and cargo port mover application ===
An example of SRLM application is the HyperTrack project led by Zeleros in the Port of Sagunto, Spain, owned and operated by Valenciaport. Developed in collaboration with CIEMAT, the installation featured a test track designed to evaluate SRLM performance in real-world port conditions. The motor system was assessed for thrust generation, control precision, and energy consumption, supporting Zeleros’ larger strategy for high-speed and freight-focused propulsion systems. Zeleros’ cargo-oriented demonstrator, known as SELF (Sustainable Electric Freight-forwarder), validated SRLMs for applications such as automated container handling and electromagnetic launch systems. The project was supported by industrial stakeholders including ArcelorMittal and Valenciaport, and received public funding through the Eurostars and CDTI innovation programs.

=== Wave and Tidal Energy Harvesting ===
In renewable energy, SRLMs are used in direct-drive power take-off (PTO) systems for wave and tidal energy converters. The SeaTitan project, funded under Horizon 2020, demonstrated the feasibility of SRLMs in offshore energy generation, avoiding the use of rare-earth materials while delivering high thrust and modularity. The project aimed to reduce the levelized cost of energy for marine applications. focused on energy harvesting from marine environments. The system explores the use of switched reluctance linear motors for direct-drive wave and tidal energy converters, converting oceanic motion into electricity without the use of rare-earth magnets or superconductors. Designed for offshore deployment, the project highlights SRLM’s durability and efficiency under variable loads and harsh conditions, offering an alternative for clean energy generation.

The SeaTitan demonstrator aims to validate SRLM systems in real-sea conditions, supporting use cases such as floating power stations, offshore battery charging, and hybrid island energy systems.

=== Industrial Linear Actuators ===
SRLMs have been applied in precision manufacturing and automation environments, where their simple and rugged design supports high-accuracy motion in pick-and-place systems, robotic arms, and packaging lines. Their magnet-free topology reduces cost and maintenance while enabling high-performance control in industrial applications.

=== Electromagnetic Launch Systems ===
SRLMs are under exploration for electromagnetic catapult systems for aircraft carriers (Electromagnetic Aircraft Launch System) and UAV deployment platforms. Their fast response, durability, and rare-earth-free design offer advantages over traditional linear induction systems, particularly in mobile or modular defense applications.

== See also ==
- Hyperloop
- Switched Reluctance Motor
- Reluctance Motor
- Maglev
- Roller coaster
- Sustainable transport
