= Electrostatic motor =

Type of electric motor based on electrostatic forces

An electrostatic motor or static motor is a type of electric motor based on the attraction and repulsion of electric charge. Unlike numerous electric motors that used low voltage and high current, electrostatic motors use high voltage and low current depending on the design and use cases.

An alternative type of electrostatic motor is the spacecraft electrostatic ion drive thruster where forces and motion are created by electrostatically accelerating ions.

== Overview ==
An electrostatic motor mainly relies on attraction and repulsion between electric charges. Electrostatic motors are usually the dual of conventional coil-based motors. They typically require a high-voltage power supply or electrostatic generator, although very small motors employ lower voltages. They are simpler and more compact to build and maintain than other electric motor types because they require fewer or no copper windings and magnetic cores, making them lighter and relying solely on electrical conductors to maintain and produce the electric field needed for operation.

Conventional electric motors use magnetic attraction and repulsion and require high current at low voltages. In the 1740s and 1750s, Andrew Gordon and Benjamin Franklin developed one of the first known motors. Today, electrostatic motors are widely used in micro-mechanical (MEMS) systems where their drive voltages are below 100 volts, moving charged plates are far easier to fabricate than coils and iron cores. However, electric fields tend to be weaker than magnetic fields and thus produce less torque due to the dielectric medium, as the voltage and current can cause dielectric breakdown that leaks charges and reduces performance or makes the motor inoperable. Magnetic fields also have greater energy density than electric fields at similar geometries. Thus, numerous organizations and inventors enclosed them in dielectrics with a higher limit than air or vacuum to keep the motor operating and produce greater torque.

== Electrostatic motor designs ==
There are many designs and their principles, each with their advantages and limitations. However, corona motors, induction motors, and capacitor motors are among the most promising because of their torque output, low maintenance, simplicity, and compactness.

An example of a corona motor built by Steven Dufresne, where the rotor is made from a plastic peanut butter jar and serves as an accessible replica of Oleg's motor.

=== Corona-discharge motor ===
The corona-discharge motor, also known as a corona motor, works by supplying high voltage to several sharp stator points, edges, wires, or other small objects that point toward the rotor, producing corona discharges with adjacent stator electrodes carrying opposite charges. For example, a positively charged stator produces positive ions that deposit on the rotor's surface (which is commonly insulated); due to Coulomb's law, these charges repel, and the rotor moves while simultaneously being attracted to the adjacent, negatively charged electrode. The negatively charged electrode removes positive ions while depositing negative ions and electrons; this also causes repulsion, then attraction. This continues until the motor builds up speed. Ionic wind also plays a role by pushing the rotor with its airflow (or other fluid medium), commonly with designs in which the stator electrodes are slanted to a specified, predetermined direction. This motor is considered more advantageous than others because it is simpler, more compact, and uses ionic wind for added rotation.

=== Induction motor ===
An induction motor is an electrostatic motor that operates like a reluctance motor or switched reluctance motor, where the stator electrodes switch polarity, charging the rotor by induction and causing it to follow the stator's opposite charges. For example, plate-shaped stators are placed outside a rotor with plates or shields on the outside close to the stators. A stator plate is supplied with a negative charge; thus, the closest rotor plate develops a positive charge on one end and a negative charge on the other, with attraction dominating due to distance. The rotor follows, but the stator changes polarity as it gets closer, repelling the rotor or energizing the adjacent stator electrode. The same applies to the opposite end of the rotor plate and its stator electrodes. An advantage of the induction motor is that it does not use corona discharge, which contributes to material degradation through chemical corrosion and thermal damage over time.

=== Capacitor motor ===
A capacitor motor is an electrostatic motor that uses AC voltage with the proper frequency between the stator and rotor, or switches the electrode charges, keeping the rotor charged without relying on mechanical commutators. It functions similarly to the induction motor. An example comes from Karl Zipernowsky, where the rotor has two pairs of aluminum sectors insulated from one another and from the rest of the device. The stator has four double-hollow brass sectors enclosing the rotor, fitted with a four-part commutator, with the rotor sectors charged opposite to the stator sectors (for example, rotor sectors are positively charged and the stator's negatively charged); they enter identical to the stator sectors; they leave (e.g., stator and rotor are negatively charged).

=== Other designs ===
Other designs include electric wind motors, sometimes called electrohydrodynamic (EHD) motors, that use electrohydrodynamics to produce rotary motion. A common example is the electric fly, where the rotor has numerous spokes or spikes pointing similarly to Hero's engine, where the rotor is placed near an electric field, such as a Van de Graaff dome, or connected to a high-voltage power supply, causing strong electric potential gradients at the ends to form a corona discharge, with the ionic wind producing a reaction that causes the rotor to spin. They function similarly to the corona motor. Another design uses electrets that have a semi-permanent electric charge. Furthermore, researchers at the Institute of Science Tokyo, Yokohama, Japan, have been experimenting with a ferroelectric fluid that reacts strongly to electrical voltage, reducing the need for high voltages to achieve lower values.

== Nanotube nanomotor ==
In 2004, researchers at the University of California, Berkeley, developed rotational bearings based upon multiwalled carbon nanotubes. By attaching a gold plate (about 100 nm in size) to the outer shell of a suspended multiwalled carbon nanotube (like nested carbon cylinders), they can electrostatically rotate the outer shell relative to the inner core. These bearings are very robust; devices have been oscillated thousands of times with no indication of wear. These nanoelectromechanical systems (NEMS) represent a promising direction in miniaturization and may find their way into commercial applications in the future.

== Electrostatic ion drive ==
Electric motors, in general, produce motion when powered by electric currents. The common type of spacecraft ion thruster uses electrostatic forces to accelerate ions to generate forces to create motion, and thus can be considered as unconventional electric motors.

Gridded electrostatic ion thrusters commonly utilize xenon gas. This gas has no charge and is ionized by bombarding it with energetic electrons. These electrons can be provided from a hot-filament cathode and accelerated in the electrical field of the cathode fall to the anode (Kaufman type ion thruster). Alternatively, the electrons can be accelerated by the oscillating electric field induced by an alternating magnetic field of a coil, which results in a self-sustaining discharge and omits any cathode (radiofrequency ion thruster).

== Example patents ==
These serve as additional examples of an electrostatic motor. The prime classifications of electrostatic motors by the USPTO are:

- Class 310 ELECTRICAL GENERATOR OR MOTOR STRUCTURE
  - 300 NON-DYNAMOELECTRIC
    - 308 Charge accumulating
    - 309 Electrostatic
- U.S. patent 633,829 -- J. Gallegos -- "Static electric Machine"
- U.S. patent 735,621 -- E. Thomson -- "Electrostatic motor"
- U.S. patent 993,561 -- Harold B. Smith -- "Apparatus for transforming electrical energy into mechanical energy"
- U.S. patent 1,693,806 -- W. G. Cady -- "Electromechanical System"
- U.S. patent 1,974,483 —- T. T. Brown -- "Electrostatic motor" (1934-09-25)
- U.S. patent 3,433,981 -- B. Bollee -- "Electrostatic Motor" (ed. Electrostatics from Atmospheric Electricity)
- U.S. patent 3,436,630 -- B. Bollee -- "Electrostatic Motor"
- U.S. patent 5,552,654 -- MITSUBISHI CHEM CORP -- "Electrostatic actuator"
- U.S. patent 5,965,968 -- Robert, et al. -- "Electrostatic Motor"

== See also ==
- Electrostatic generator
- Nanomotor
- Oxford Electric Bell

== External articles and further reading ==
- de Queiroz, Antonio Carlos M., "An Electrostatic Linear Motor". 24 January 2002.
- William J. Beaty, "Simple Electrostatic Motor".
- "ElectrostaticMotor", tm.net.
- Fast and Flexible Electrostatic Motors at Univ. Tokyo"".
- Heavy Lifting Electrostatic Motors at Univ. Tokyo"".
- E. Sarajlic et al., 3-Phase Electrostatic Stepper Micromotors
