= Flux switching alternator =

Alternator with six-pole rotor

A flux switching alternator is a form of high-speed alternator, an AC electrical generator, intended for direct drive by a turbine. They are simple in design with the rotor containing no coils or magnets, making them rugged and capable of high rotation speeds. This makes them suitable for their only widespread use, in guided missiles. (Note: "Missile" here is taken in its broad sense and could refer to any guided projectile, potentially including torpedoes as well as airborne missiles.)

== Guided missiles ==
Guided missiles require a source of electrical power during flight. This is needed to power the guidance and fuzing systems, possibly also the high-power loads of an active radar seeker (i.e. a transmitter) and rarely the missile's control surfaces. Control surface actuators for a high-speed missile require a high force and so these are usually powered by some non-electric means, such as tapping propellant exhaust gas from the missile's motor. Rare exceptions where electrically powered control surfaces are used are mostly medium-range subsonic naval missiles, e.g. Exocet, Harpoon and Martel. The total load varies for different missiles between around 100W to several kW.

The electrical supply for a missile must be reliable, particularly after long storage. Depending on the missile type, it may also be required to start delivering power almost immediately after start-up, or even before launch to allow gyroscopes to be accelerated to speed, and to provide power for varying lengths of time. Small anti-tank or air-to-air missiles may only require power for a few seconds of flight. Others, such as tactical missiles or ICBMs, may require power for several minutes. Turbojet-powered cruise missiles have the longest flight times (being long-ranged, yet also slowest in flight); however, these also have engines that are capable of driving a more conventional generator.

Two technologies are used in practice to power missiles: batteries and generators. The batteries used are usually esoteric types rarely found outside missiles, such as silver-zinc or thermal batteries. The generators used are simple high-speed generators, driven directly by a turbine rotor that is powered by either the rocket motor's exhaust, or else a dedicated gas generator.

== Alternator principles ==
The generator is required to be rugged and capable of very high speeds, as it is driven at the turbine's speed, without reduction gearing. The rotor must thus be simple in design and there can also be no sliding contacts to sliprings or other brushgear. Although the power requirement for the missile may be a largely DC supply, the AC alternator and its need for a rectifier is still favoured for its mechanical robustness.

Unusually, both the field coils and the armature winding are carried on the fixed stator. The rotor is a simple toothed wheel, with no windings or electrical components.

In the simplest case, the stator has four poles and the field coils and armature windings are arranged alternately around the stator between the poles. The field magnets are arranged with their poles opposing each other, i.e. one armature is between the two North poles, one between the two South. The rotor is a simple toothed disc of magnetic, but unmagnetized, iron. As it rotates between poles, it links the flux between a single pair of opposing poles. The magnetic circuit of the stator is thus a pair of triangles, each containing a field, an armature and a shared path through the rotor. Flux passes in each circuit from one field and through one armature. As the rotor turns, the other triangular path is formed, switching the flux from one pair of field and armature to the other and also reversing the direction of the flux in the armature coil. It is this reversal of flux that produces the alternating emf.

The rotor must bridge the path between opposing pole pieces, but must never bridge all four simultaneously. It must thus have an even number of poles, but this must not be divisible by four. Practical rotors use six poles. As the rotation of one tooth pitch is sufficient to generate one AC cycle, the output frequency is thus the product of the rotation speed (in revs. per second) and the number of rotor teeth. Early AC systems used the standard frequency of 400 Hz, which limited alternators to two pole rotors and a maximum rotation speed of 24,000 rpm. The use of higher frequencies, from multi-pole rotors, was already recognised as a future means to achieve greater power for the same weight. The Seaslug missile alternator used a speed of 24,000 rpm to produce 1.5 kVA of electricity at 2,400 Hz.

The field may be supplied by either permanent magnets or by field coils. Regulation of the output voltage is achieved by controlling the current through a winding, either the field coil, or a control winding around a permanent magnet.

== Alternator drive ==
=== Propulsion motor ===
The simplest solution taps off some hot exhaust gas from the propulsion motor and routes it instead through the generator turbine. This gas may also be used to power the control surface actuators, as was used for Vigilant. This is one of the simplest and lightest electrical power supplies available for a missile.

Bleeding exhaust gas from the motor increases the amount of fuel required, but this effect is trivial, around 1%. The exhaust is hot, possibly as hot as 2,400 °C, and at pressures varying from 2,600 psi at the boost phase to 465 psi during sustain. A more serious drawback is the amount of sooty particulates in the exhaust, which requires a filter to keep them from the turbine. As such filters may themselves clog, this method is best suited for short flight durations.

=== Gas generator ===
A gas generator is a chemical device that burns to provide a supply of gas under pressure. Although still hot, comparable to rocket motor exhaust, this gas can be cooler and cleaner of particulates than rocket efflux. Both solid and liquid-fuelled gas generators may be used.

Advantages of a gas generator drive, rather than motor exhaust are:

- Cleaner, cooler exhaust, which is less likely to cause turbine problems.
- Ability to start the gas generator before launching, allowing time for gyroscopes to be spun up to speed, power for control surfaces etc.
- Ability to continue power generation after the motor has burned out, during a ballistic coast phase.

=== Development history ===
The first alternators of this type began with the first missiles requiring considerable electric power, those using radar seekers (initially semi-active radar homing). Development of these began in the late 1940s, with air-to-air missiles such as Sparrow. Sparrow was a relatively large missile with an airframe 8 inches in diameter. By the late 1950s, turbine-driven alternators were also being used in lightweight anti-tank missiles such as Vigilant. Vigilant has a body diameter of 4 1/2 inches, including a 3/4 inch central jetpipe. The alternator and turbine were fitted into a remaining annular space of only 1 7/8 inches.

==== Permanent magnet magnetos ====
An alternative high-speed generator is the permanent magnet magneto. Achieving the output needed depends on the use of modern rare-earth magnets, such as samarium cobalt or neodymium. The output coil is formed as a stator, with axial magnetic flux from a rotating multi-pole ring magnet.

== See also ==
- Alexanderson alternator
- Variable reluctance sensor
- Switched reluctance motor
