= Andrew Gordon (Benedictine) =

Scottish Benedictine monk, physicist and inventor

Andrew Gordon (15 June 1712 – 22 August 1751) was a Scottish Benedictine monk, physicist and inventor. He made the first electric motor.

== Life ==
Andrew Gordon was born in Cofforach, Forfarshire. He was a son of an old Scottish aristocratic family and baptized with the name George. At the age of 12, he travelled to Regensburg, Bavaria, in order to study at the Benedictine Scottish Monastery. As a Catholic Scot, there was no possibility of getting entrance to higher offices in his homeland.

In Regensburg, he completed a 5-year general education course of study. Abbott Bernhard Baillie made it possible for Gordon to make education journeys to Austria, France and Italy, in particular to Rome. Gordon returned to Regensburg in 1732. On 24 February 1732 he enrolled as a novice and received the name of "Andreas". In the monastery he began with the study of scholastic philosophy under Gallus Leith, who in 1735 at the Erfurter university was appointed as a Professor for Philosophy.

Gordon studied intensely with the Dominican Iselbrecher, where he took also his theological disputation. In the same year, Andreas Gordon was entered to the priesthood, afterwards he completed law studies at the Benedictine University of Salzburg, where he studied law and theology. In 1737 he completed his study in philosophy and theology with “excellence” and passed the legal exam with honours. Subsequently, he became a professor of philosophy at the University of Erfurt.

Gordon soon acquired considerable reputation by his works on electricity, among which were Phaenomena electricitatis exposita (1744), Philosophia utilis et jucunda (1745) and Physicae experimentalis elementa (1751–52).

For the sulphur ball of von Guericke (1671) and the glass globe of Isaac Newton (some say Hauksbee), Gordon substituted a glass cylinder which made an efficient frictional machine. Two other inventions in physics are noteworthy: the first is the light metallic star supported on a sharp pivot with the pointed ends bent at right angles to the rays and commonly called the electrical whirl, the second is the device known as the electric chimes. These inventions used to be described in textbooks of electricity. The name of Gordon was not always mentioned, though both inventions are fully described by him in his Versuch einer Erklarung der Electricitat (Erfurt 1745).

Benjamin Franklin, who is usually credited with the latter invention, simply adopted the "German chimes" (described by Watson in his famous Sequel, 1746) to serve as an electrical annunciator in connection with his experimental lightning rod of 1752. The "whirl" was an electrostatic reaction motor, the earliest of its kind; while the second derives its theoretical importance as the first instance of the application of what came to be called electric convection.

Gordon died in Erfurt, Thuringia.

== See also ==
- List of Roman Catholic scientist-clerics
- Electrostatic motor
- Lightning bell
- Franklin bells
