= Peter Lawrenson =

Electrical engineer

Peter Lawrenson FRS FREng FIEE
- Born: 12 March 1933; Prescot, Merseyside, England
- Died: 27 October 2017 (aged 84); Harrogate, North Yorkshire, England
- Education: University of Manchester
- Known for: Switched reluctance drives
- Awards: Faraday Medal (1990); IEEE Edison Medal (2005); FREng(1983)
- Scientific career
- Workplaces: University of Leeds

Peter John Lawrenson (12 March 1933 – 27 October 2017) was an Emeritus Professor of Electrical Engineering at the University of Leeds who pioneered and championed the development of switched reluctance drive technology. He also made significant contributions to the analysis and computation of magnetic fields and electrical machines in general, writing several notable text books along with colleagues Kenneth Binns, Martyn Harris and J. Michael Stephenson and latterly with C.W. ("Bill") Trowbridge.

== Biography ==
Lawrenson was born in Prescot, Lancashire, and educated at the University of Manchester from which he held the degrees of BSc, MSc and DSc. From 1956 to 1961 he was a research engineer at GEC. His early published activities include work on linear electrical machines with Eric Laithwaite, in which the linear induction motor was considered as a propulsion means for the shuttle in textile weaving machines.

In 1961 Lawrenson was appointed a Lecturer in Electrical Engineering at the University of Leeds, from where his publications show growing interest in reluctance machines - initially AC-fed synchronous reluctance motors and later doubly-salient synchronous machines such as stepper motors (resulting in numerous further publications throughout the 1970s, often co-authored with research students and colleagues including Austin Hughes, Michael Stephenson, Paul Acarnley, Philip Blenkinsop, Norman Fulton and Jasmin Corda, to name but some of his co-workers). The first seminal paper on switched reluctance machines was published in 1980. He remained at Leeds for 30 years, being promoted to Reader in 1965 and Professor of Electrical Engineering in 1966. He retired from his chair in 1991 with the title Emeritus Professor, in order to devote his full-time attention to the growing business he had co-founded in Leeds, Switched Reluctance Drives Ltd.

Lawrenson is considered the father of the switched reluctance motor and associated drive technology. Based on research work that had been carried out jointly by the University of Leeds and the University of Nottingham, in 1980 he and three colleagues (Michael Stephenson, Bill Ray and Rex Davis) established a design, technology development and licensing business, Switched Reluctance Drives Ltd. Initially based in Leeds, UK, the company was sold to Emerson Electric in 1994, and whilst still based in the north of England at Harrogate, it became a wholly owned subsidiary of Nidec Corporation of Japan in 2010 (to whom Emerson sold its entire US-based motor interests). The former SR specialist unit was transferred to Nidec's Drive Systems subsidiary in 2016, but was much reduced in size and scope in 2019 when Nidec ended all manufacturing at the Harrogate site and greatly downsized the (until then) substantial engineering team. By now, under Nidec's direction, the business unit was already increasingly focused on other motor technologies, notably synchronous permanent magnet machines. Nidec Drive Systems continues to supply SR motors and inverters, but presently only for a minority of customer-specific industrial and off-road vehicle applications.

Lawrenson was the recipient of the Faraday Medal of the Institution of Electrical Engineers, the ESSO Energy Gold Medal of The Royal Society and the J.A. Ewing Gold Medal of the Institution of Civil Engineers. He was elected a Fellow of the Royal Academy of Engineering (FREng) in 1980 and of the Royal Society (FRS) in 1982. Lawrenson won the IEEE Edison Medal in 2005 For outstanding contributions to the field of electrical machines, most notably the development and commercialization of switched reluctance drives.

Lawrenson was president of The Institution of Electrical Engineers from 1992 to 1993.
