= Vilnius Computer Factory =

Manufacturing company based in Lithuania

Coordinates: 54.71°N 25.288°E

Vilnius Computer Factory (Lithuanian: Vilniaus skaičiavimo mašinų gamykla) was a computer and computer-component manufacturer and developer (via a special development bureau (Lithuanian: Skaičiavimo mašinų specialus konstravimo biuras)) in Vilnius, Lithuanian SSR. Established in 1956, it became a part of the Sigma Industrial Association in 1966.

== History ==
In 1954, the USSR Council of Ministers decided to establish a cash register factory in Vilnius which began operations in 1956. In 1957, the first cash registers were produced, but in 1959 the factory was repurposed for the production of early computers (computing machines). A special development bureau was established to develop and design original computing machines. In 1959, the first series of external 80-column punched card machines was manufactured. Production of the first electronic calculator EV80-3M (a copy of IBM 604 designed in Moscow) began in 1961. In 1962, Vilnius Computer Factory developed the first Lithuanian electronic calculator – electronic random process analyzer EASP-S, which was produced in 1964–1967. In 1963, the first Lithuanian second generation (transistor-based) computer EVP80-2 Rūta was developed. Its processor could perform 2,500 operations per second.

In June 1966, Vilnius Calculation Machine Factory was awarded the Order of the Red Banner. In the same year, the Sigma Industrial Association was established. The association included Vilnius Computer Factory, Vilnius Electricity Meter Factory, Pabradė Counting Technology Factory Modulis, Telšiai Counting Machine Factory, Tauragė Counting Machine Elements Factory, and Panevėžys Precision Machine Factory.

== Products ==
- 1960–1965 EV80-3M, developed in Moscow, assembled in Vilnius (IBM 604 clone);
- 1964–1967 EASP-S, first developed computer;
- 1964–1974 EVP80-2 Rūta, based on discrete transistors;
- 1964–1970 ATE80-1, developed in Moscow, assembled in Vilnius;
- 1969–1972 Rūta-110, which had handwritten OCR capability with Rūta-701;
- 1973–1979 M5000, minicomputer;
- 1975–1981 M5010;
- 1978–1984 M5100;
- 1982–1988 SM 1600 (one processor was PDP-11/34 clone);
- 1986–1990 SM 1700 (VAX-11/730 clone).

== See also ==
- Nuklonas, integrated circuit manufacturer since 1966, which also produced PC computers and their integrated circuits BK-0010 (discontinued in 1992).
