= ULN =

ULN can refer to:

- Buyant-Ukhaa International Airport, Ulaanbaatar, Mongolia
- Unbreakable Linux Network, a service of Oracle Corporation
- Upper limit of normal, the high limit of a reference range
- A series of a Darlington transistor arrays, e.g. ULN2003A
