= Nikon Nikkor Z 180-600 mm f/5.6-6.3 VR =

Nikkor Z 180-600 mm f/5.6–6.3 VR
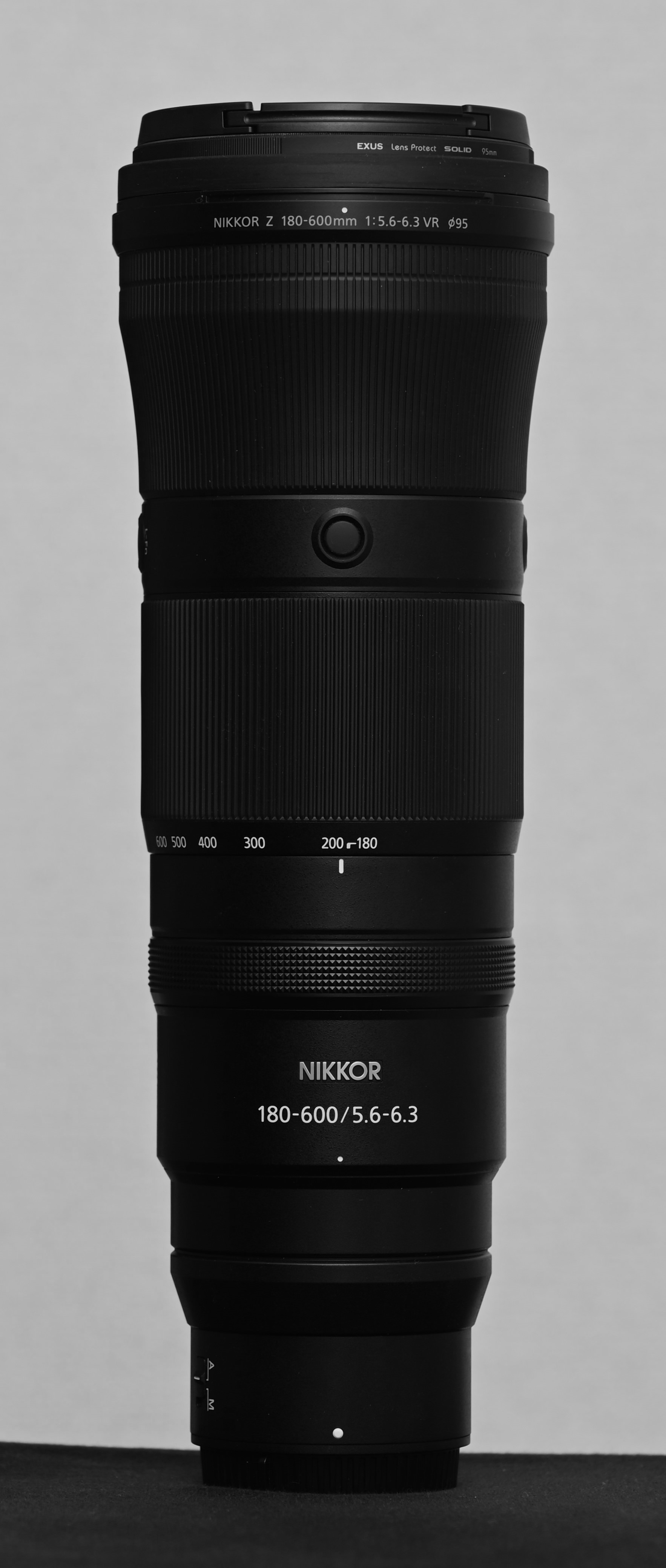
- Maker: Nikon
- Lens mount: Z-mount

Technical data
- Type: Zoom
- Focus drive: Stepping motor
- Focal length: 180-600mm
- Image format: FX (full frame)
- Aperture (max/min): f/5.6–32 (wide) f/6.3–36 (tele)
- Close focus distance: 1.3m (wide); 2.4m (tele)
- Max. magnification: 1:4
- Diaphragm blades: 9 (rounded)
- Construction: 25 elements in 17 groups

Features
- Lens-based stabilization: Yes Yes
- Macro capable: No No
- Unique features: Fluorine Coat
- Application: Super-telephoto zoom

Physical
- Max. length: 315.5 mm
- Diameter: 110 mm
- Weight: 2140 g (w/ tripod collar); 1955 g
- Filter diameter: 95 mm

Software
- Latest firmware: 1.01 (as of 29 May 2024)
- User flashable: Yes Yes
- Lens ID: 42

Accessories
- Lens hood: HB-109 (bayonet)
- Case: CL-C6

Angle of view
- Diagonal: 13°40'–4°10' (FX); 9°–2°40' (DX)

History
- Introduction: June 2023

Retail info
- MSRP: 1699.95 USD (as of 2023)

The Nikon Nikkor Z 180-600 mm f/5.6–6.3 VR is a full-frame super-telephoto zoom lens with a variable aperture of f/5.6–6.3, manufactured by Nikon for use on Nikon Z-mount mirrorless cameras.

== Introduction ==
The lens was introduced on June 21, 2023. The lens has a removable tripod collar. The lens comes with a bayonet-type lens hood (HB-109). The lens is compatible with teleconverters Z TC-1.4x and Z TC-2.0x.

== Features ==
- 180-600 mm focal length (approximately equivalent field of view of a 270-900 mm lens when used on a DX format camera)
- Autofocus using a stepping motor (STM), focus-by-wire manual focus ring
- 25 elements in 17 groups (including 6 ED glass, 1 aspherical lens element and a fluorine-coated front lens element)
- 9-blade rounded diaphragm
- Vibration Reduction (VR) optical stabilization
- Internal focusing (IF lens)
- Internal zooming
- One customizable control ring at the back (manual focusing by default, aperture, ISO and exposure compensation functions can be assigned to it)
- Four L-Fn customizable buttons for a single assignable function
- A/M switch for autofocus/manual focus modes
- Focus limiter switch (full and infinity - 6 m)
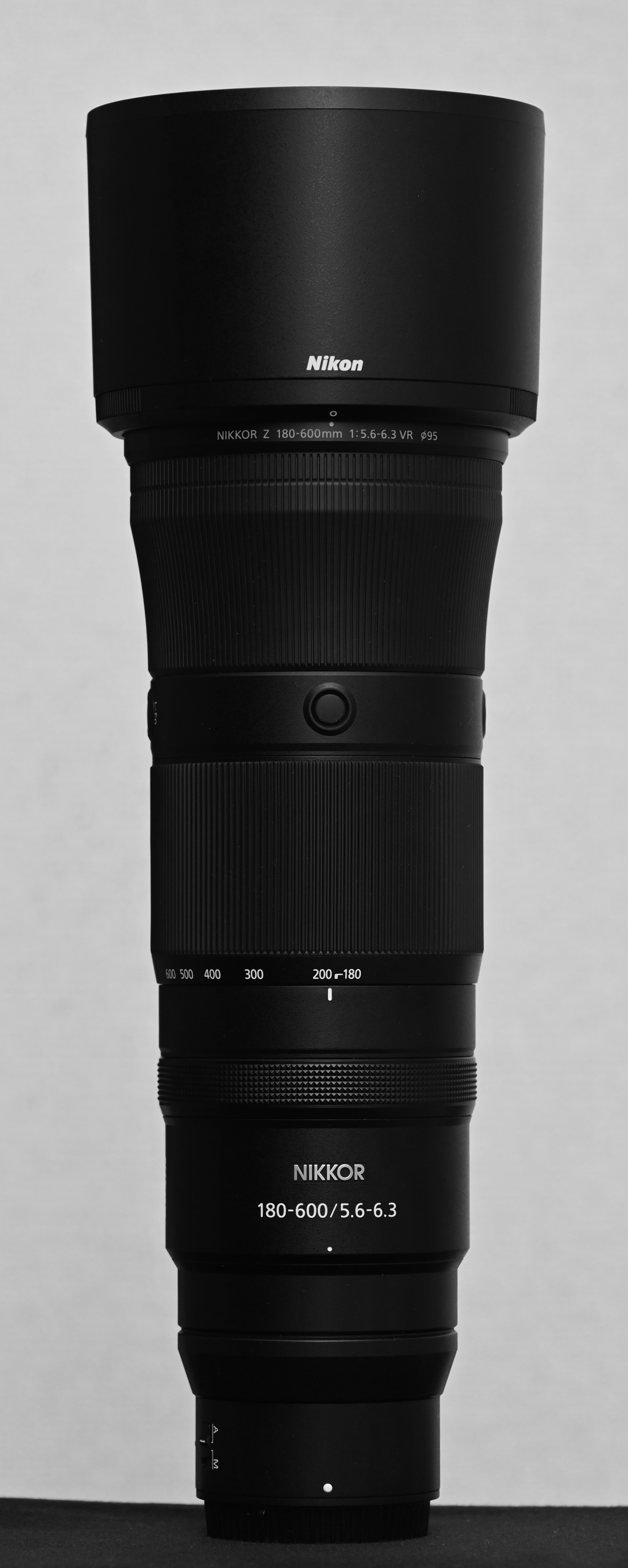
With lens hood attached

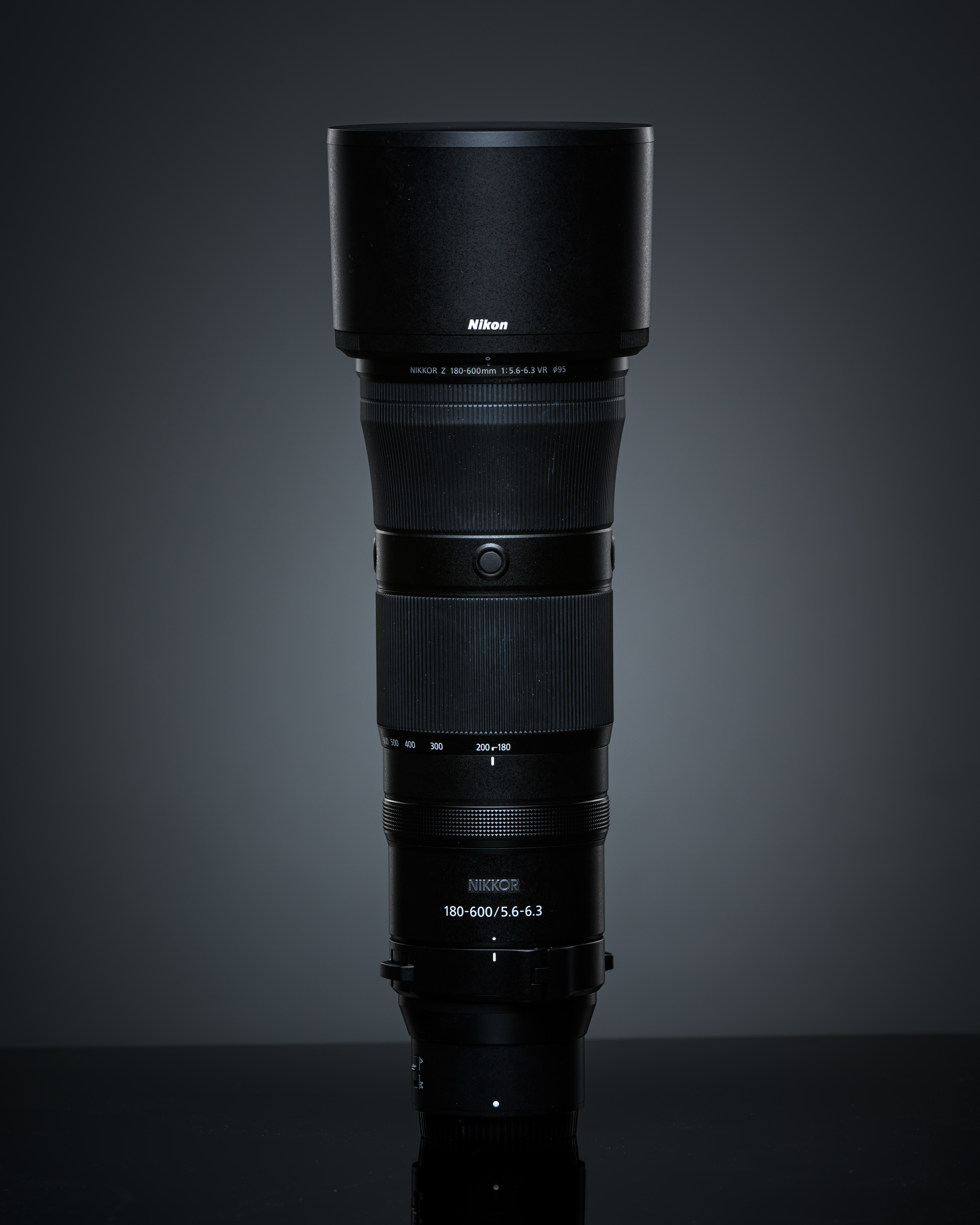
With lens hood and collar attached

== Sample images ==
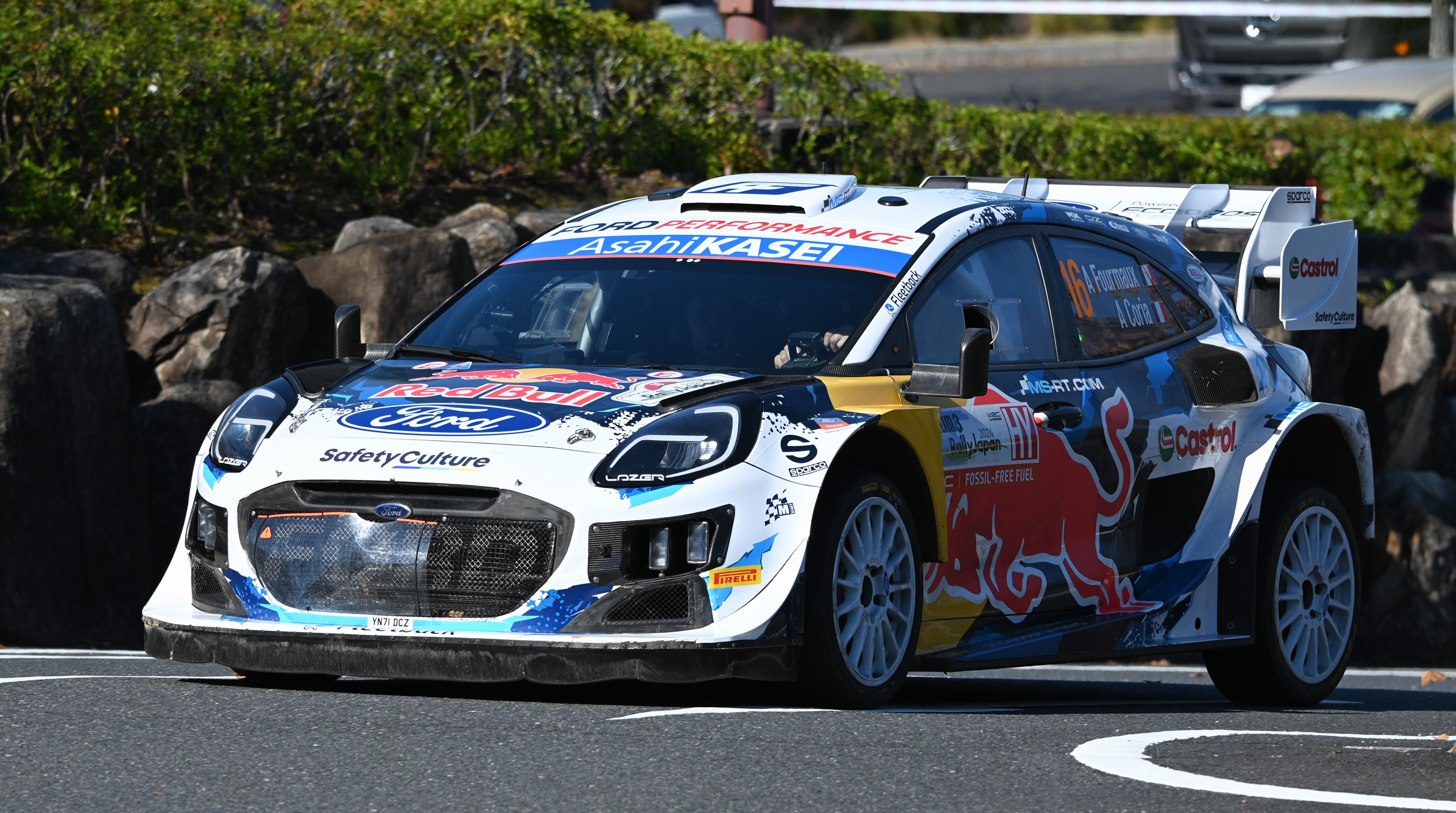
At 280 mm, f/5.6

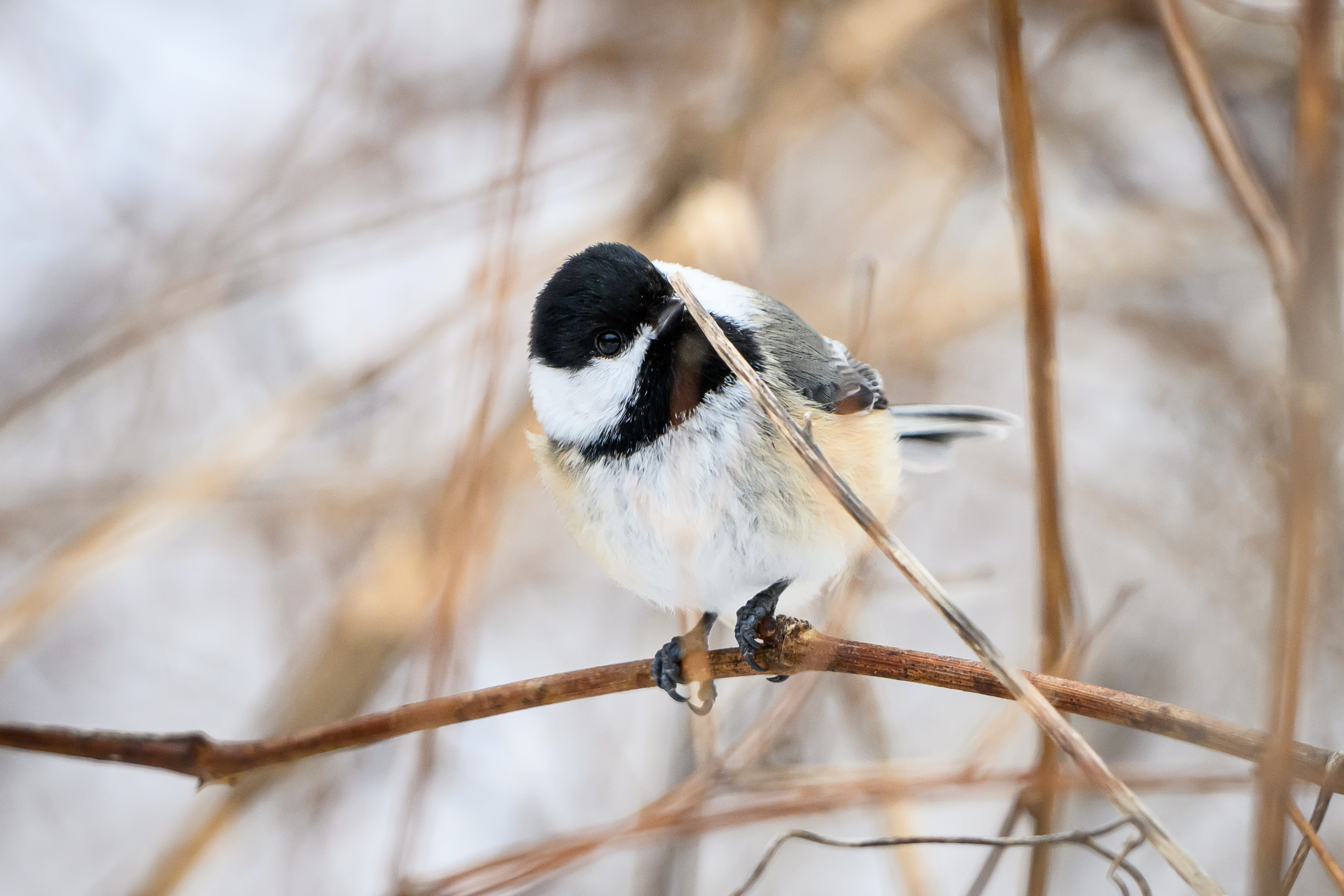
At 360 mm, f/6

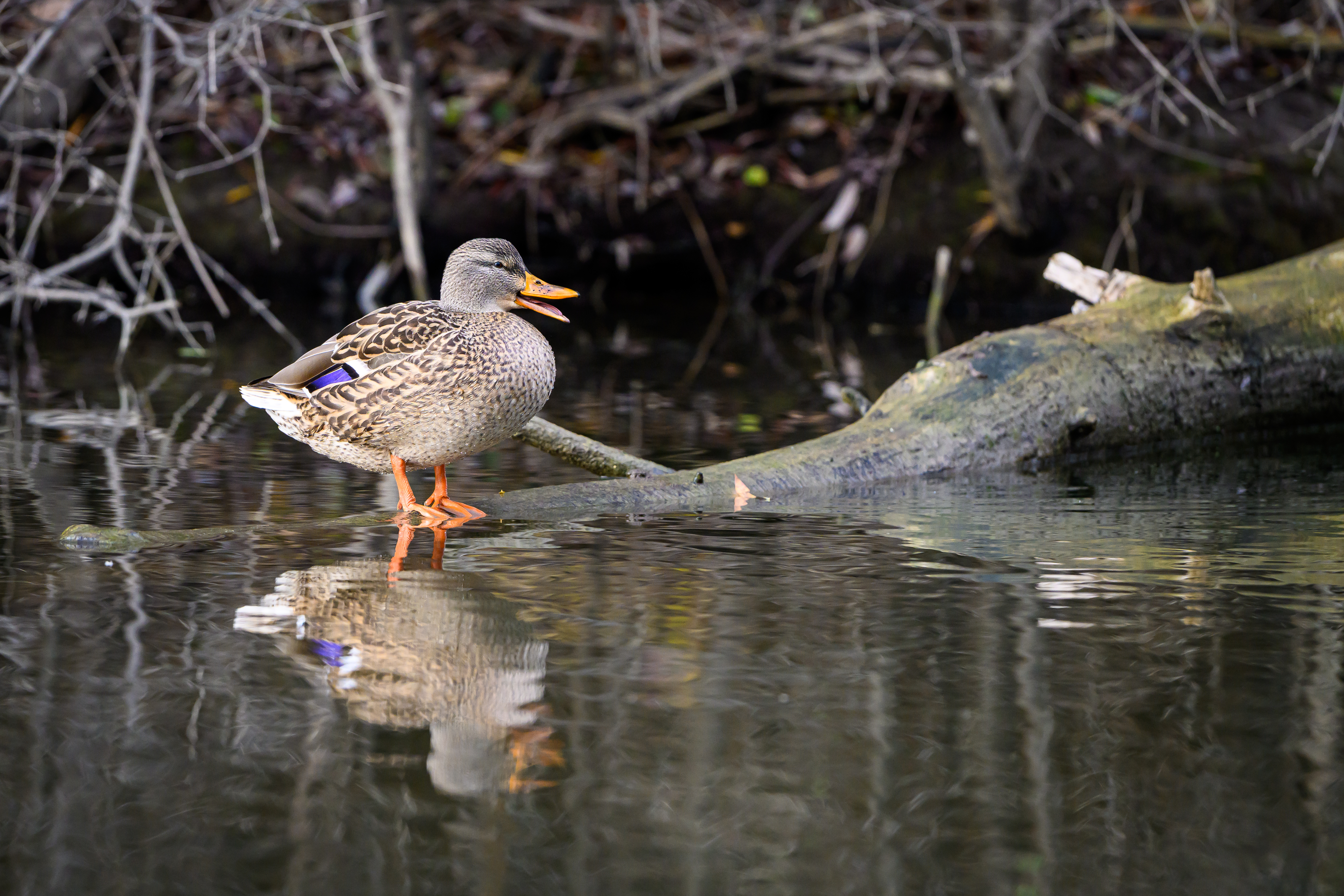
At 470 mm, f/6

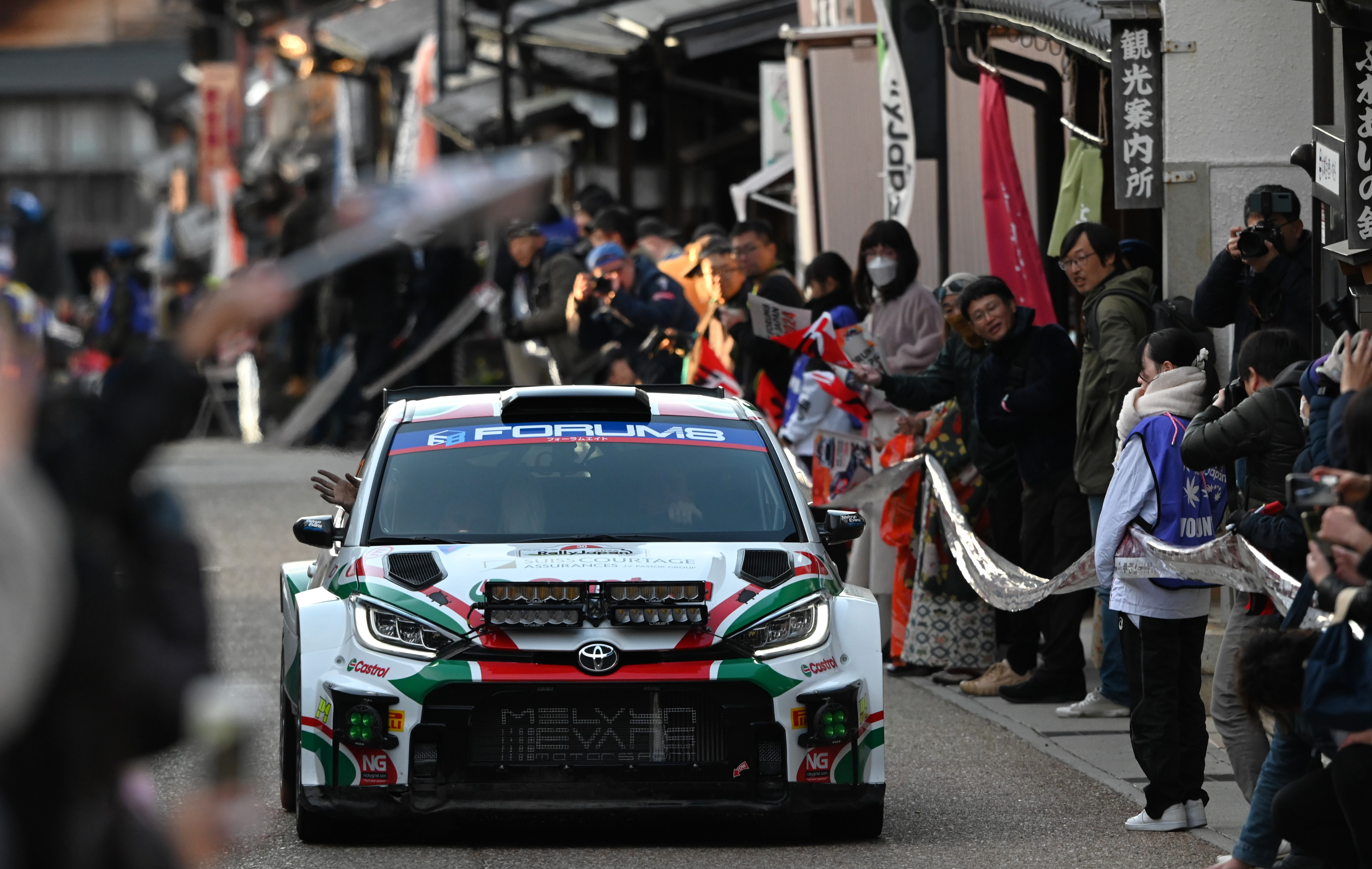
At 490 mm, f/7.1

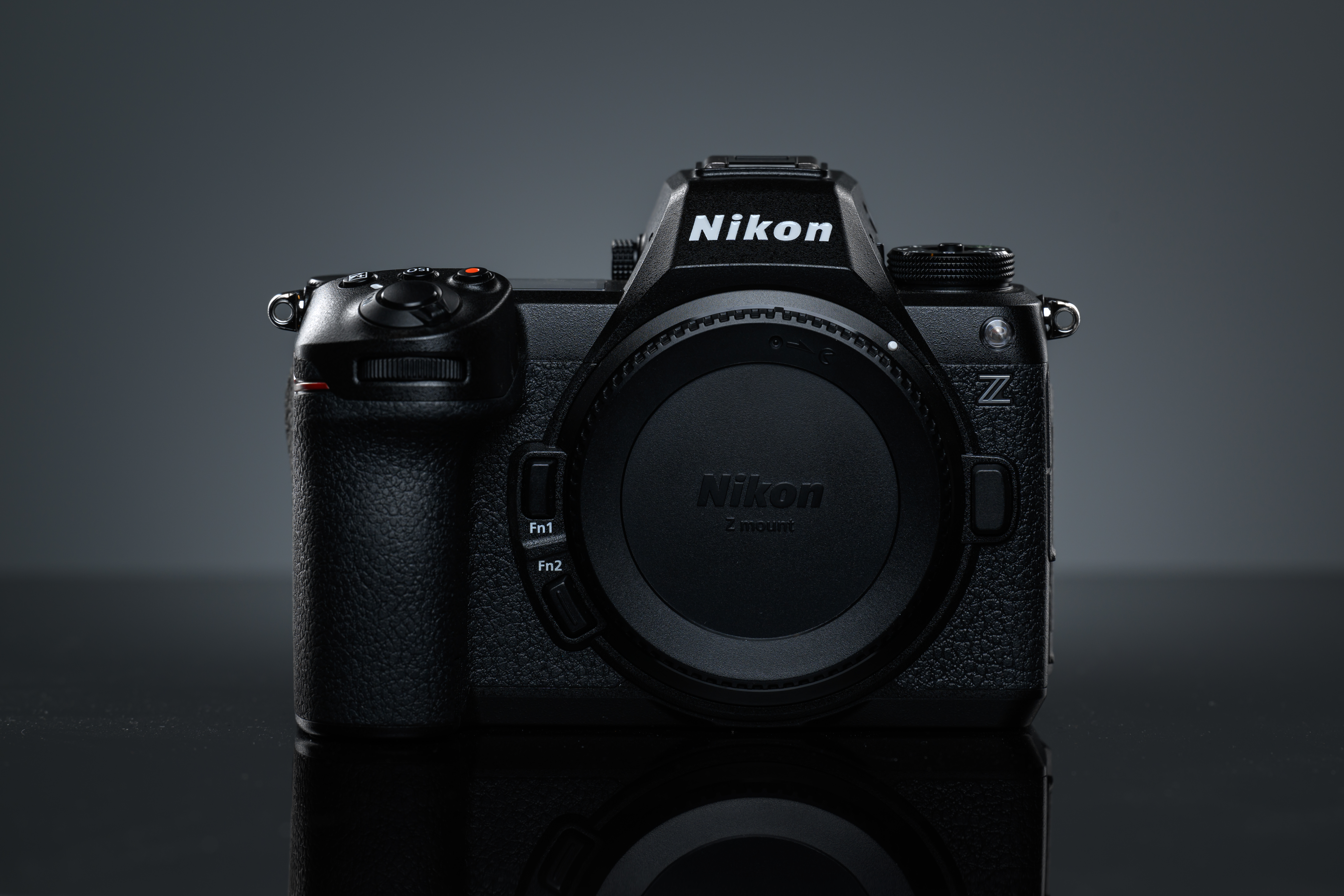
At 530 mm, f/8

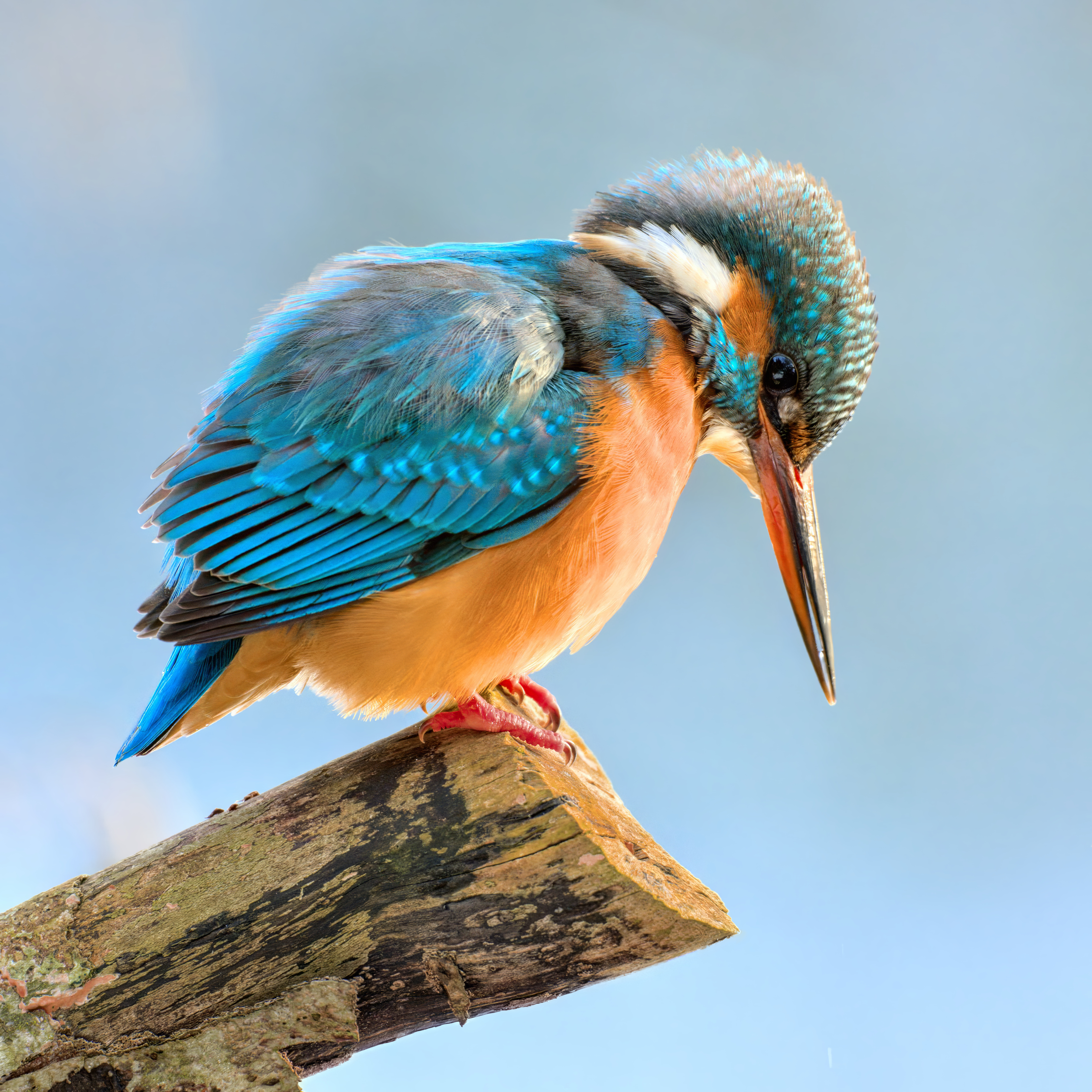
At 540 mm, f/8

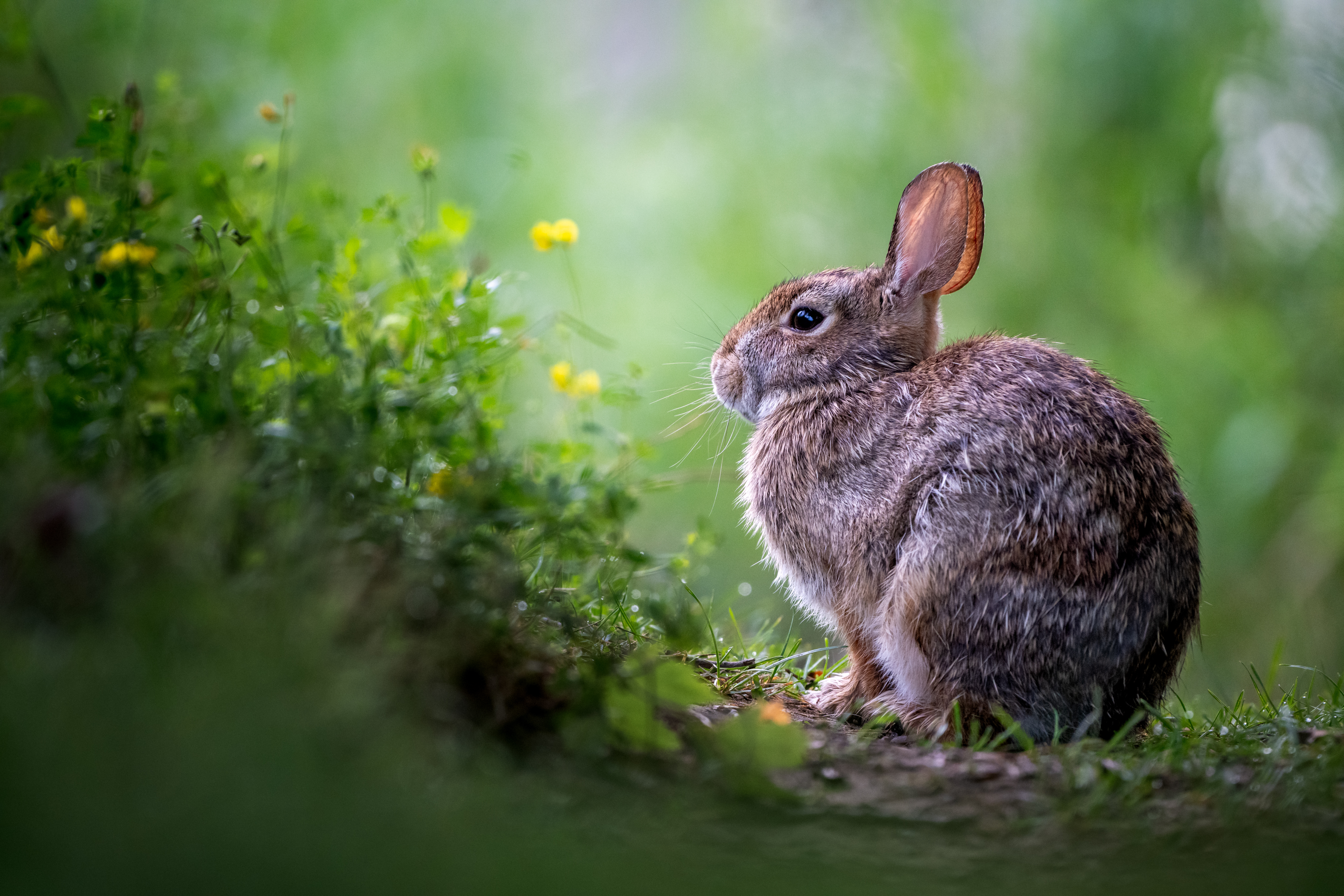
At 600 mm, f/6.3

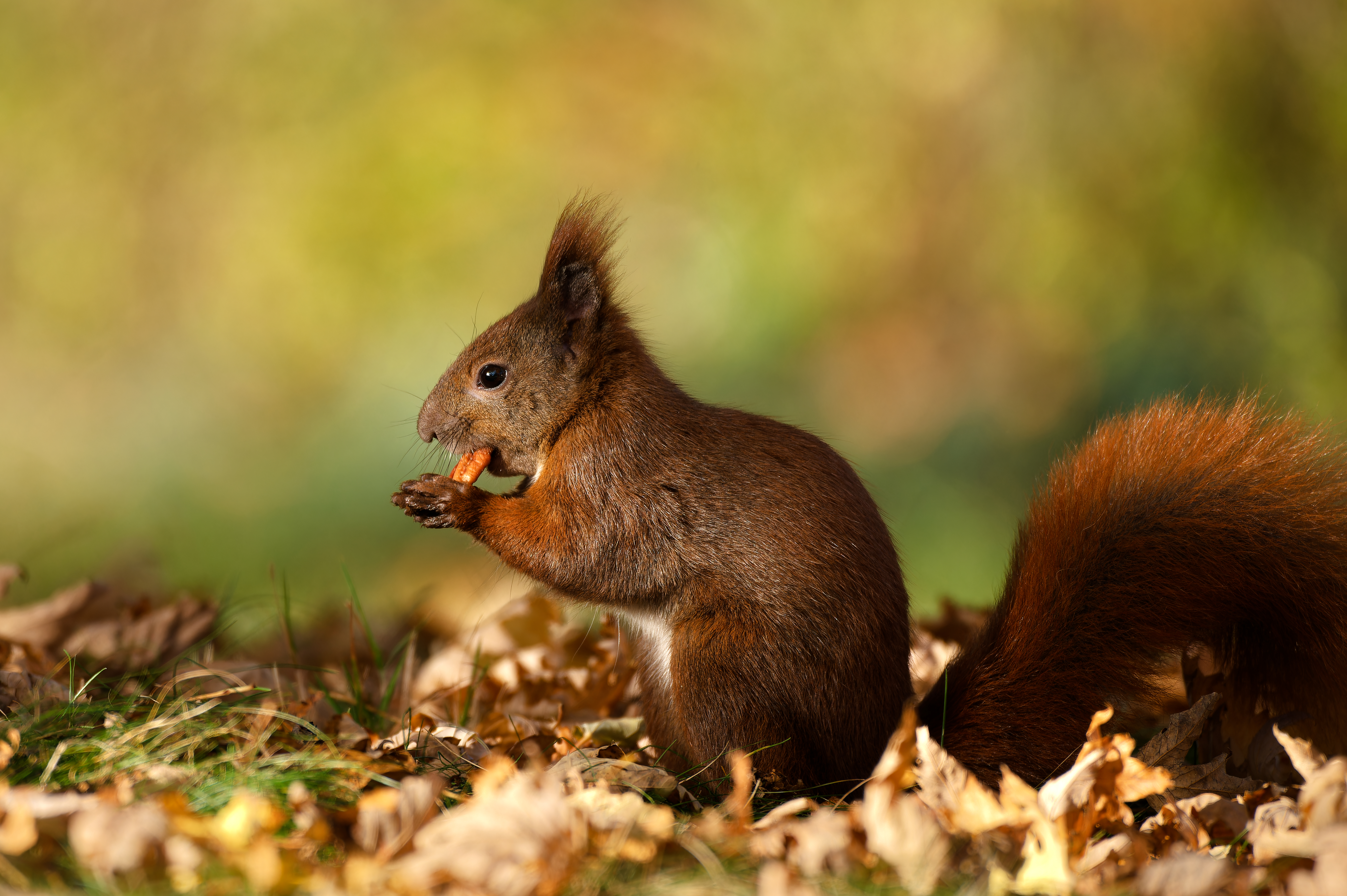
At 600 mm, f/6.3

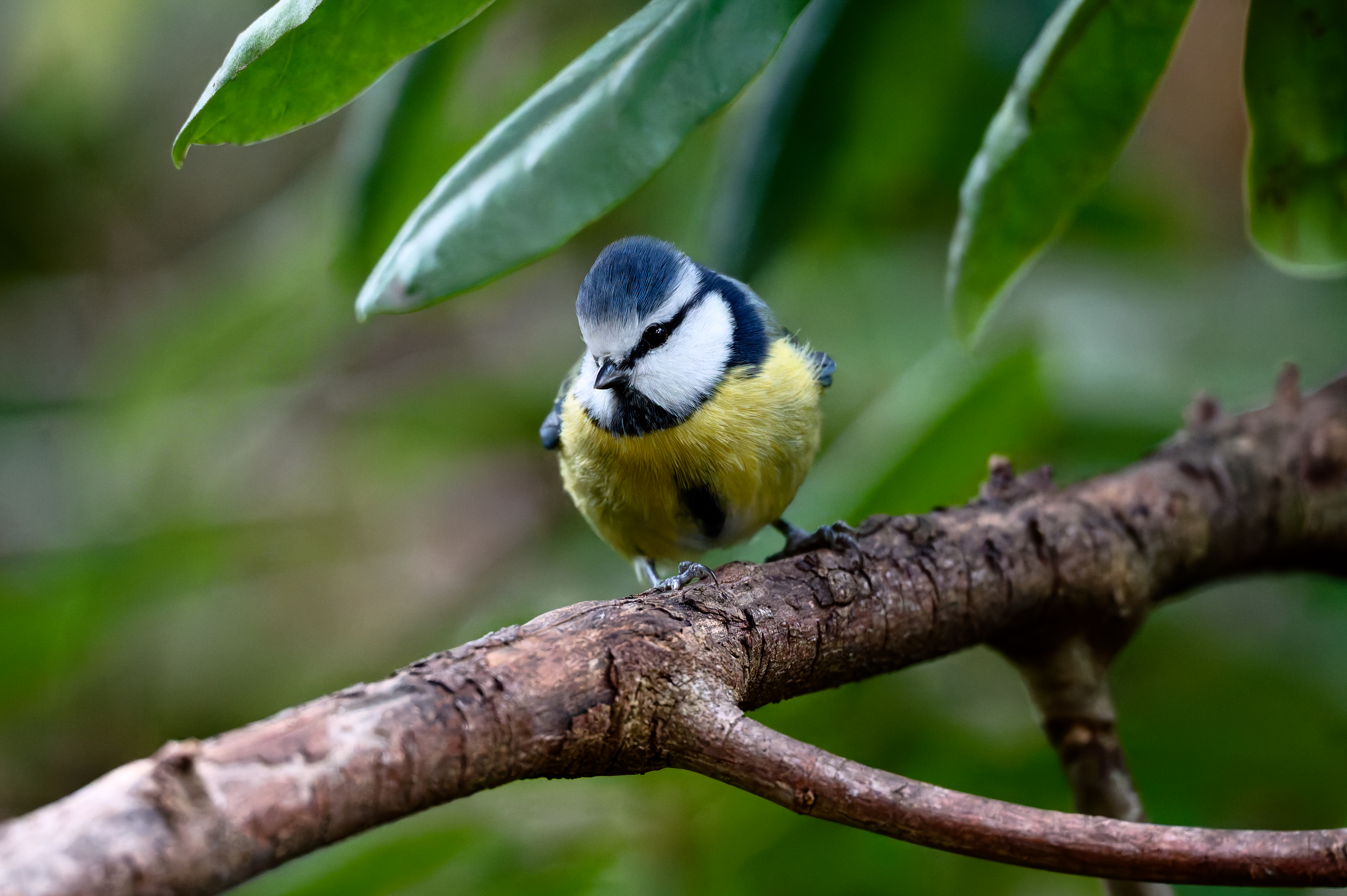
At 600 mm, f/6.3

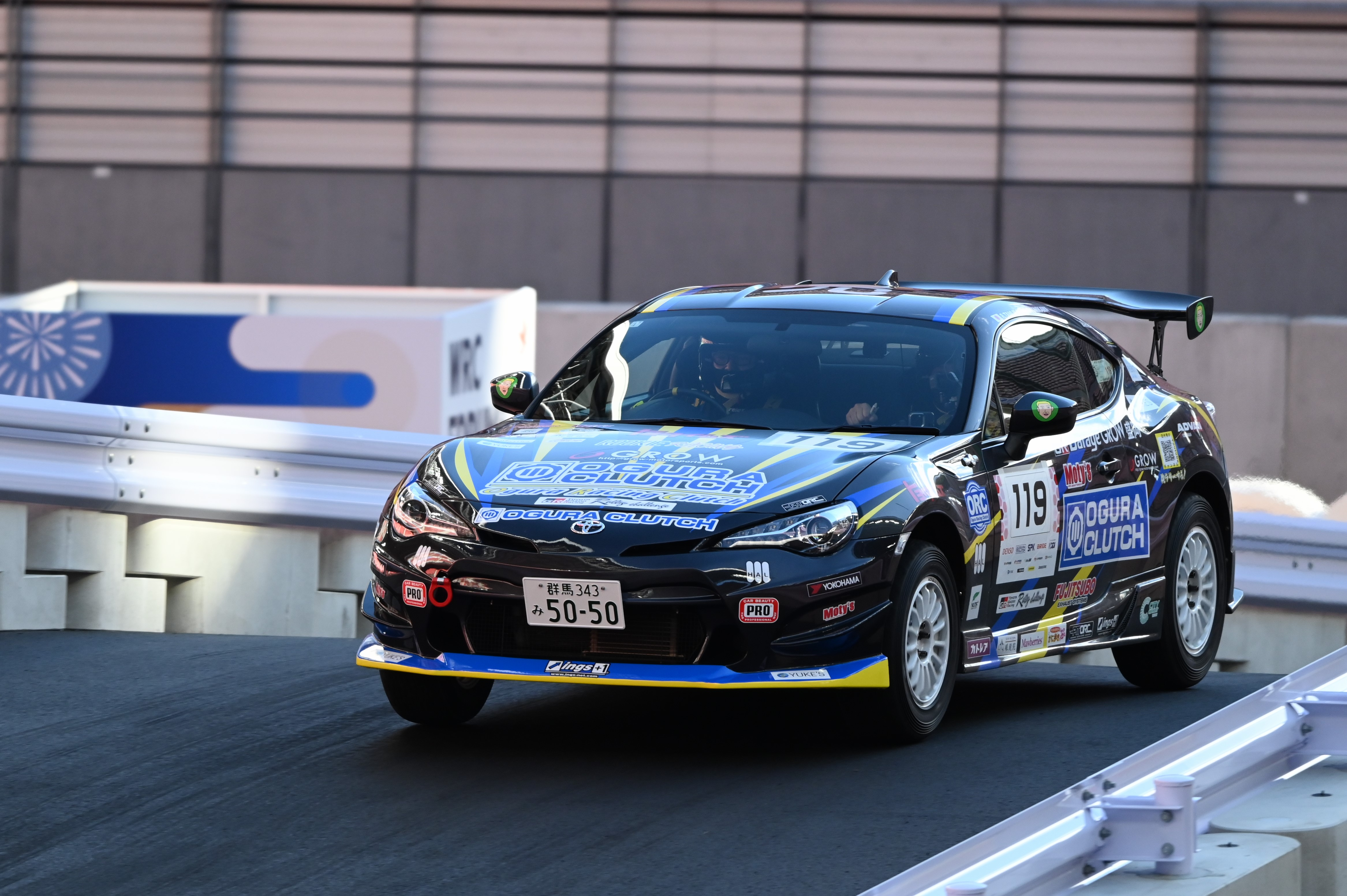
At 600 mm, f/6.3

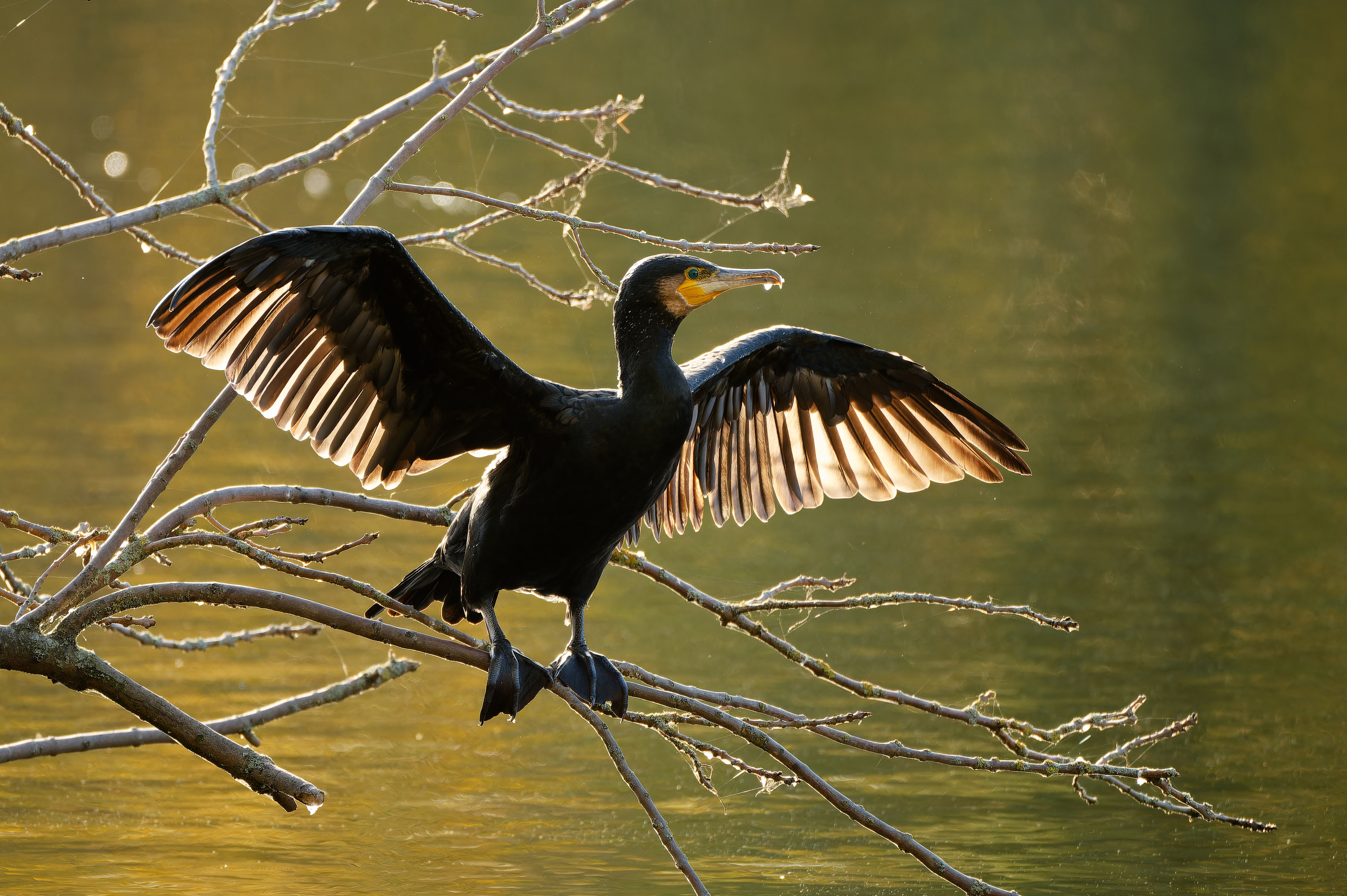
At 600 mm, f/6.3

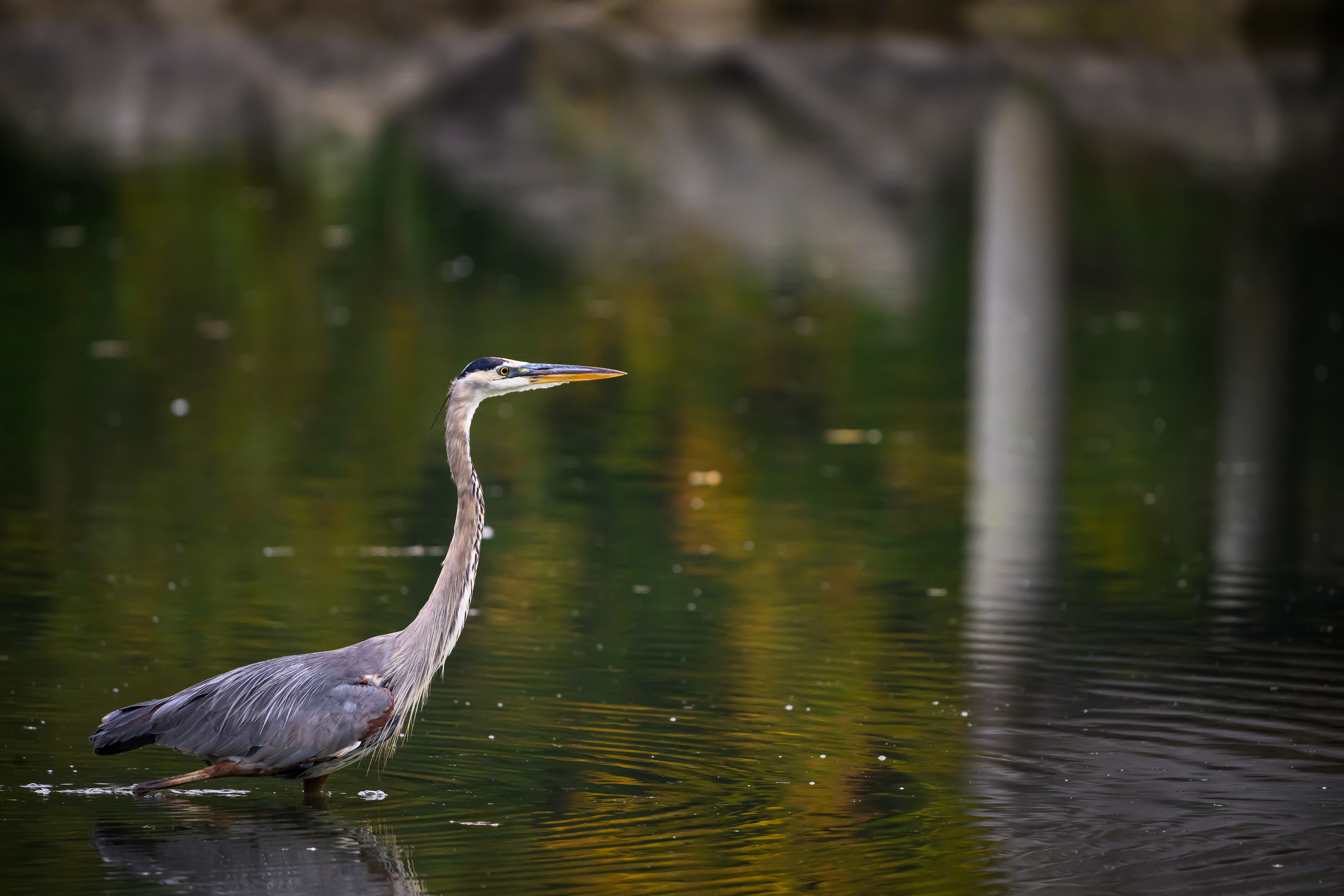
At 600 mm, f/6.3

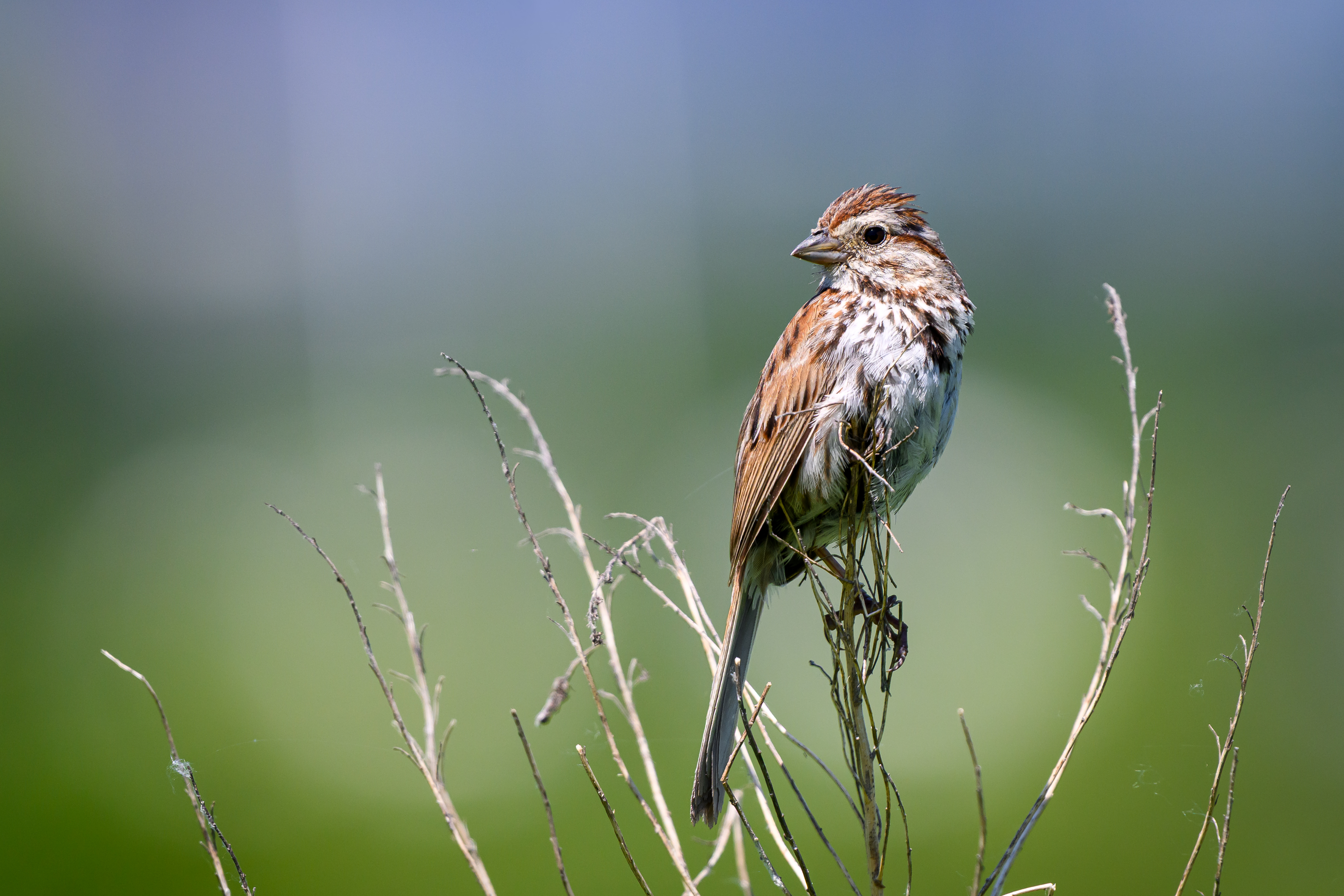
At 600 mm, f/6.3

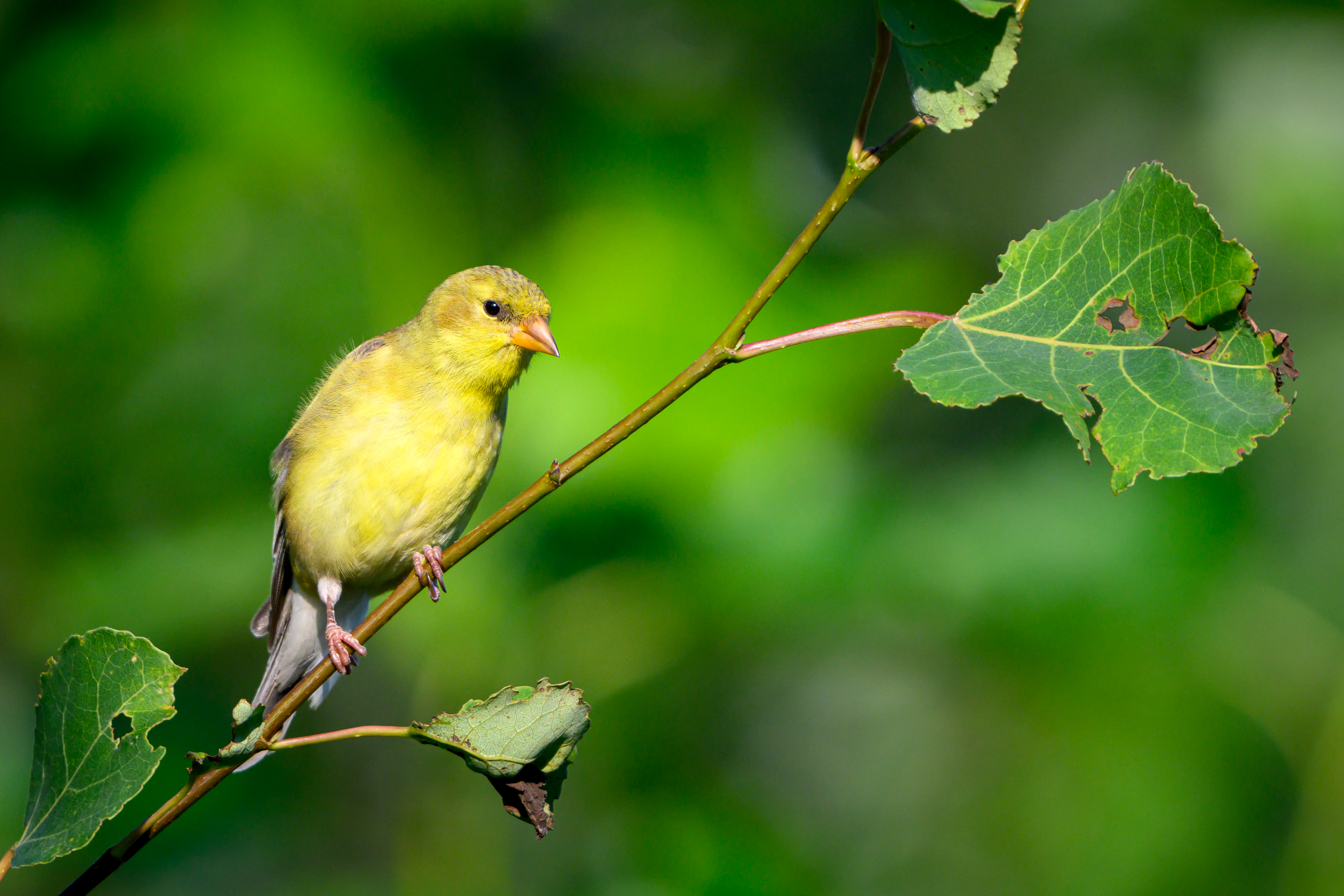
At 600 mm, f/6.3

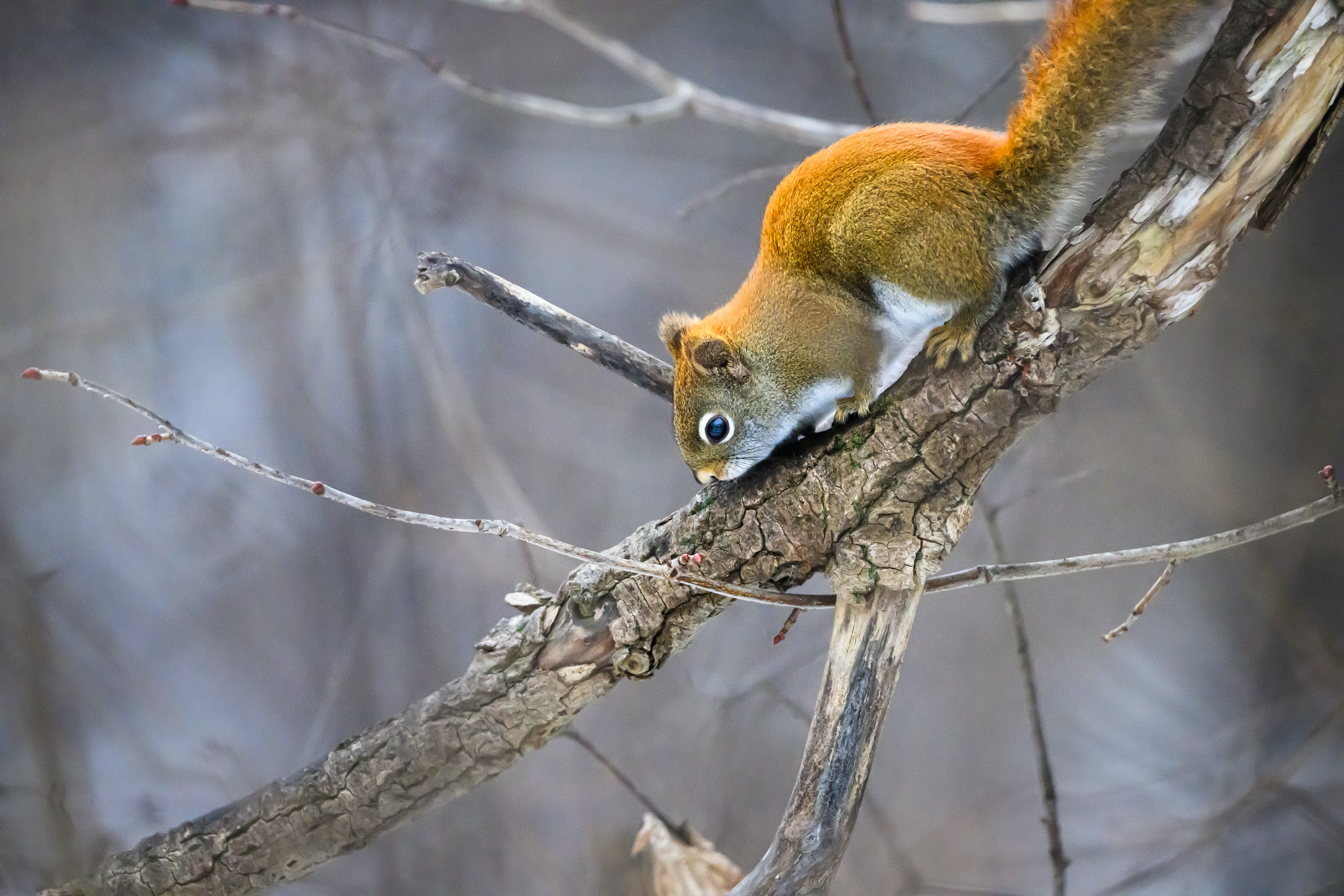
At 600 mm, f/6.3

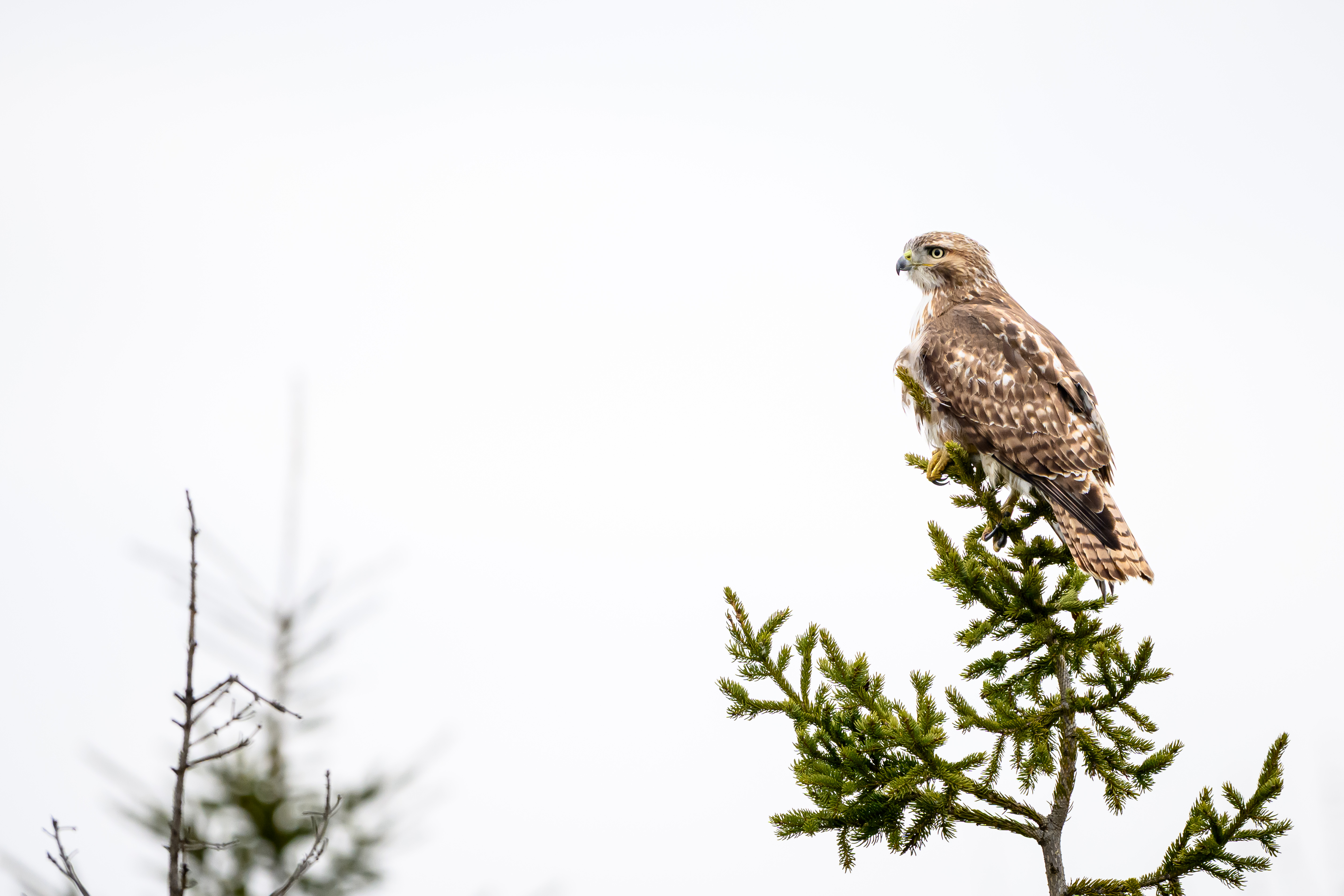
At 600 mm, f/6.3

== See also ==
- Nikon Z-mount
