= Nuklonas =

Coordinates: 55°55′00″N 23°14′37″E

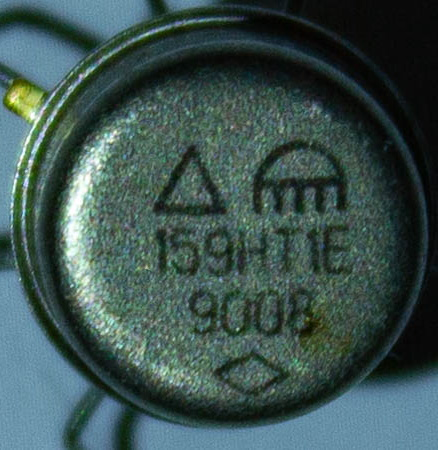
Transistor array with the designation 159HT1E, bearing the logo of Nuklonas (top right), manufactured 1990

Nuklonas (PO Box M-5621) is a former military manufacturer of integrated circuits in Šiauliai, Lithuanian Soviet Socialist Republic.

== Soviet times ==
The factory was established in 1966. According to Algirdas Brazauskas, it was established in Šiauliai because Alexander Shokin, Minister of Electronic Industry, was elected to the Supreme Soviet of the Soviet Union in the city. The factory occupied a territory of 12 hectares (30 acres); its buildings had 44,000 square metres (470,000 sq ft) of floor space. At its peak it employed some 4,200 workers. The factory produced modern integrated circuits for the most important civilian and military instruments. When in 1984, United States formed the Strategic Defense Initiative to re-ignite an arms race with the Soviet Union, Soviet Ministry of Electronic Industry suggested that the factory be expanded by 20,000 square metres (220,000 sq ft). Lithuanian communists, including Petras Griškevičius and Algirdas Brazauskas, refused. The episode is cited as an example of local soviet officials defending Lithuanian interest against orders from Moscow. From 1986 on, the factory produced BK 0010 personal computers to be used in high schools.

== Post-independence ==
In 1990–92, alongside its main production, the factory produced monocrystalline silicon solar cells. In 1994, the factory was declared bankrupt. In 1995, the factory resumed production, controlled by AB Nuklonas (registered on November 22, 1994). During the first months company had 250 employees and reached the income of 300,000 Lt. In 1996, the company was obliged to transfer its retreat center worth 1,145,000 Lt to the city of Šiauliai. In October 1997, the creditors of AB Nuklonas decided to liquidate the company.

In 1989, the enterprise commissioned artist Anicetas Simutis to produce a tapestry for its newly constructed culture house. The work Saulėtas miškas (Sunny Forest) measures 6.7 by 14.3 metres (22 ft × 47 ft) and is recognized by the Lithuanian Records Book as the largest in Lithuania. Due to the Nuklonas bankruptcy, the tapestry was sold back to Simutis. In 1993, the unfinished culture house was transferred to the Catholic Church in hopes that a congregation could re-purpose the building as a church. The church operated there until 2006, when the property was sold to VP Group, which built a shopping mall in its place.

After the liquidation of AB Nuklonas, integrated circuits manufacturing in Šiauliai ceased to exist. The buildings of the factory were split among various companies. Since 1998, the AB Nuklonas administration building has housed the Šiauliai University's Faculty of Social Sciences. The university wanted to establish Šiauliai University Science and Technology Park, but the project failed due to debts and mismanagement.
