= ULN2003A =

IC for low-to-high power load switching

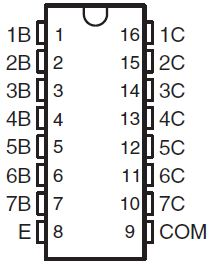
ULN2003A pinout

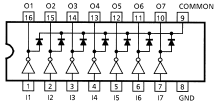
Simplified ULN2003A logical pinout diagram.

The ULN2003A is an integrated circuit produced by Texas Instruments. It consists of an array of seven NPN Darlington transistors capable of 500 mA, 50 V output. It features common-cathode flyback diodes for switching inductive loads (such as servomotors). It can come in PDIP, SOIC, SOP or TSSOP packaging. In the same family are ULN2002A, ULN2004A, as well as ULQ2003A and ULQ2004A, designed for different logic input levels.

The ULN2003A is also similar to the ULN2001A (4 inputs) and the ULN2801A, ULN2802A, ULN2803A, ULN2804A and ULN2805A, only differing in logic input levels (TTL, CMOS, PMOS) and number of in/outputs (4/7/8).

== Darlington Transistor ==
A Darlington transistor (also known as Darlington pair) achieves very high current amplification by connecting two bipolar transistors in direct DC coupling so the current amplified by the first transistor is amplified further by the second one. The resultant current gain is the product of those of the two component transistors:

$\beta_\mathrm{total} \approx \beta_1 \cdot \beta_2$

The seven Darlington pairs in ULN2003 can operate independently except the common cathode diodes that connect to their respective collectors.

== Features ==
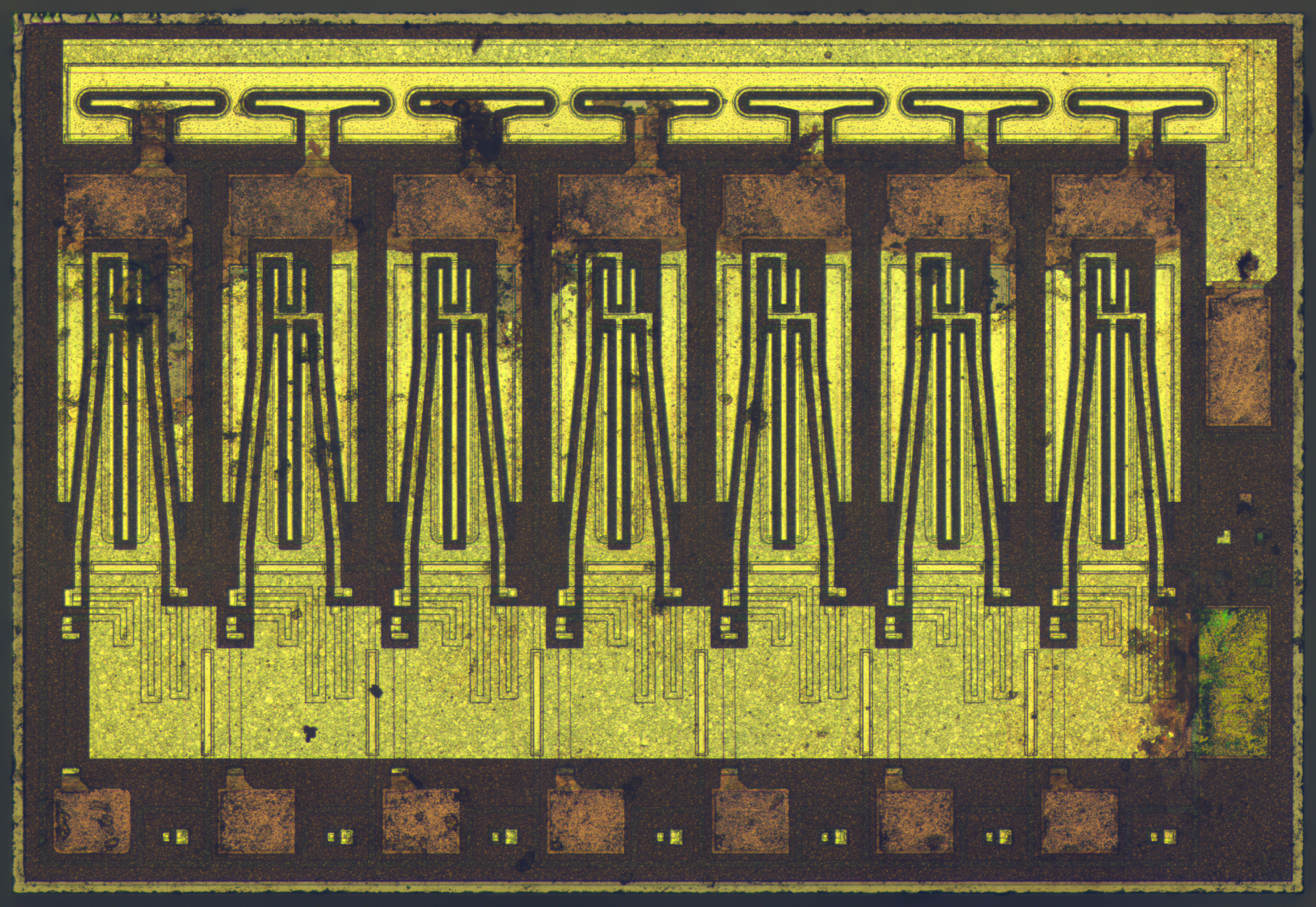
Chip die for ULN2003.

The ULN2003 is known for its high-current, high-voltage capacity. The drivers can be paralleled for even higher current output. Even further, stacking one chip on top of another, both electrically and physically, has been done. Generally it can also be used for interfacing with a stepper motor, where the motor requires high ratings which cannot be provided by other interfacing devices.

Main specifications:

- 500 mA rated collector current (single output)
- 50 V output (there is a version that supports 100 V output)
- Includes output flyback diodes
- Inputs compatible with TTL and 5-V CMOS logic

== Applications ==
Typical usage of the ULN2003A is in driver circuits for relays, solenoids, lamps and LED displays, stepper motors, logic buffers and line drivers.

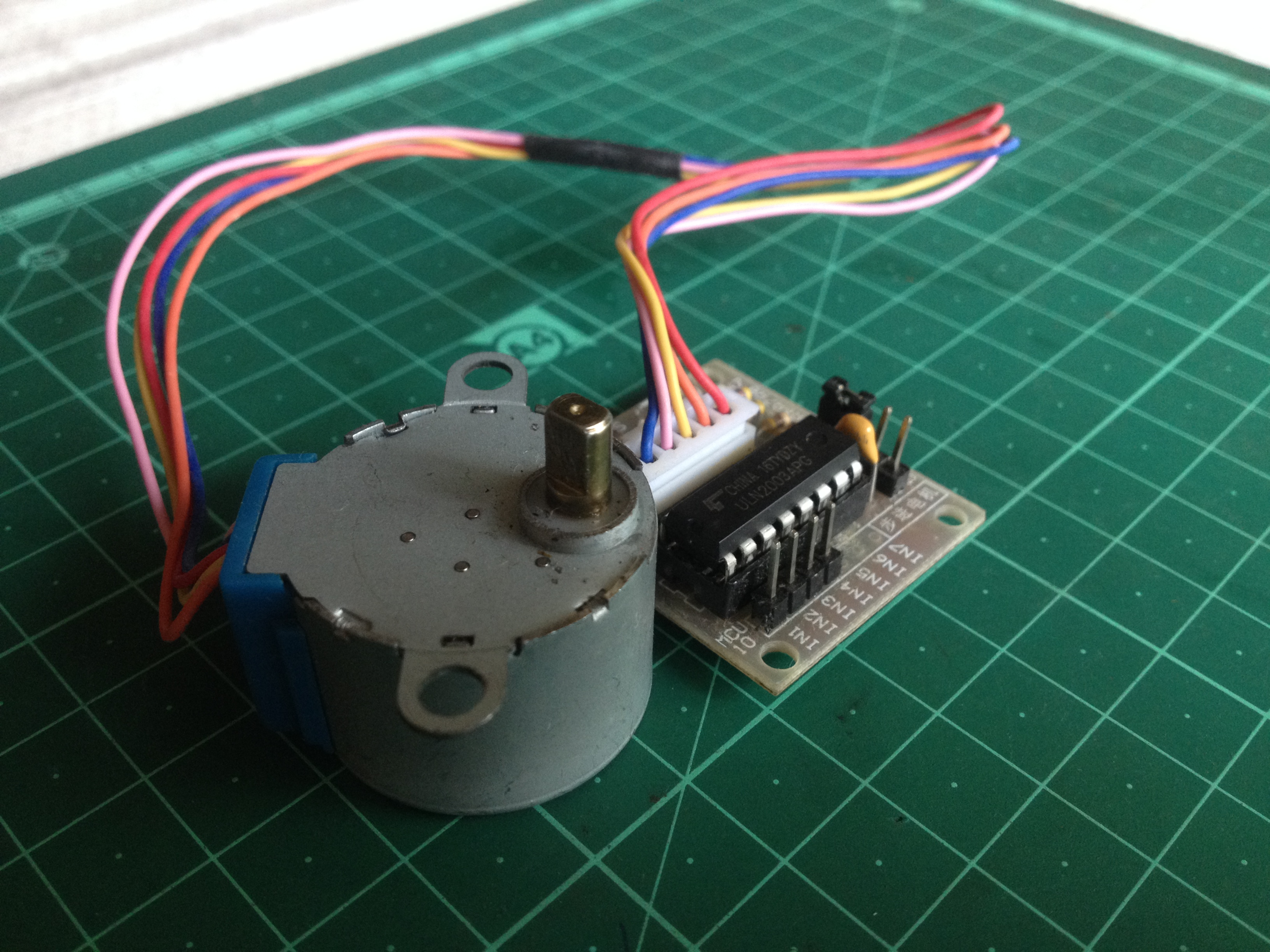
A ULN2003 installed in a breakout board to be used as a unipolar stepper motor driver with a 28BYJ stepper motor on the left.

== See also ==
- Solid state relay
