= Driver circuit =

Electrical circuit or component used to control another circuit or component

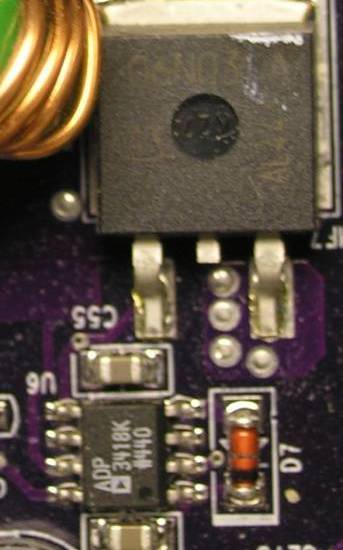
The driver ADP3418 chip (bottom left), used for driving high-power field transistors in voltage converters. Above it is seen next to such a transistor (06N03LA), probably driven by that driver.

In electronics, a driver is a circuit or component used to control another circuit or component, such as a high-power transistor, liquid crystal display (LCD), stepper motors, SRAM memory, and numerous others.

They are usually used to regulate current flowing through a circuit or to control other factors such as other components and some other devices in the circuit. The term is often used, for example, for a specialized integrated circuit that controls high-power switches in switched-mode power converters. An amplifier can also be considered a driver for loudspeakers, or a voltage regulator that keeps an attached component operating within a broad range of input voltages.

Typically the driver stage(s) of a circuit requires different characteristics to other circuit stages. For example, in a transistor power amplifier circuit, typically the driver circuit requires current gain, often the ability to discharge the following transistor bases rapidly, and low output impedance to avoid or minimize distortion.

In SRAM memory driver circuits are used to rapidly discharge necessary bit lines from a precharge level to the write margin or below.

== See also ==
- Hitachi HD44780 LCD controller
