= Dextrin =

Low-molecular-weight carbohydrates

Identifiers
CAS Number	9004-53-9
ChemSpider	none
ECHA InfoCard	100.029.693
E number	E1400 (additional chemicals)
KEGG	C00721
PubChem CID	62698
UNII	2NX48Z0A9G
CompTox Dashboard (EPA)	DTXSID20891750

Properties
Chemical formula	(C_{6}H_{10}O_{5})_{n}
Molar mass	variable
Appearance	white or yellow powder
- Except where otherwise noted, data are given for materials in their standard state (at 25 °C [77 °F], 100 kPa). verify (what is ?) Infobox references

Dextrins are low-molecular-weight carbohydrates produced by the hydrolysis of starch and glycogen. Dextrins are mixtures of polymers of D-glucose units linked by α-(1→4) or α-(1→6) glycosidic bonds.

Dextrins can be produced from starch using enzymes like amylases, as during digestion in the human body and during malting and mashing in beer brewing or by applying dry heat under acidic conditions (pyrolysis or roasting). This procedure was first discovered in 1811 by Edme-Jean Baptiste Bouillon-Lagrange. The latter process is used industrially, and also occurs on the surface of bread during the baking process, contributing to flavor, color and crispness. Dextrins produced by heat are also known as pyrodextrins. Starch hydrolyses during roasting under acidic conditions, and short-chained starch parts partially rebranch with α-(1,6) bonds to the degraded starch molecule. See also Maillard reaction.

Dextrins are white, yellow, or brown powders that are partially or fully water-soluble, yielding optically active solutions of low viscosity. Most of them can be detected with iodine solution, giving a red coloration; one distinguishes erythrodextrin (dextrin that colours red) and achrodextrin (giving no colour).

White and yellow dextrins from starch roasted with little or no acid are called British gum.

A dextrin with α-(1→4) and α-(1→6) glycosidic bonds

== Uses ==
Yellow dextrins are used as water-soluble glues in remoistenable envelope adhesives and paper tubes, in the mining industry as additives in froth flotation, in the foundry industry as green strength additives in sand casting, as printing thickener for batik resist dyeing, and as binders in gouache paint and also in the leather industry.

White dextrins are used as:

- A crispness enhancer for food processing, in food batters, coatings, and glazes (INS number 1400)
- A textile finishing and coating agent to increase weight and stiffness of textile fabrics
- A thickening and binding agent in pharmaceuticals and paper coatings
- A pyrotechnic binder and fuel; this is added to firework effect or color compositions; allowing them to solidify as pellets (stars or comets); and to sparkler compositions which the handle is dipped in
- A stabilizing agent for certain explosive metal azides, particularly Lead(II) azide

Owing to their rebranching, dextrins are less digestible than other carbohydrates. Indigestible dextrins have been developed as soluble stand-alone fiber supplements and for adding to processed food products.

== Other types ==
Maltodextrin
Maltodextrin is a short-chain starch sugar used as a food additive. It is also produced by enzymatic hydrolysis from gelled starch, and is usually found as a creamy-white hygroscopic spray-dried powder. Maltodextrin is easily digestible, being absorbed as rapidly as glucose, and might either be moderately sweet or have hardly any flavor at all. Commercial maltodextrin is typically composed of a mixture of chains that vary from three to 17 glucose units long.
Amylodextrin
Amylodextrin is a linear dextrin or short chained amylose that can be produced by enzymatic hydrolysis of the alpha-1,6 glycosidic bonds or debranching amylopectin. Amylodextrin colors blue with iodine and is typically composed of a mixture of chains that vary from 20-30 glucose units long.
α-Limit dextrin
α-Limit dextrin is a short chained branched amylopectin remnant, produced by hydrolysis of amylopectin with alpha amylase.
β-Limit dextrin
β-Limit dextrin is the remaining polymer produced by enzymatic hydrolysis of amylopectin with beta amylase, which cannot hydrolyse the alpha-1,6 bonds at branch points.
Cyclodextrin
The cyclical dextrins are known as cyclodextrins. They are formed by enzymatic degradation of starch by certain bacteria, for example, Paenibacillus macerans (Bacillus macerans). Cyclodextrins have toroidal structures formed by 6–8 glucose residues.
Highly Branched Cyclic Dextrin
Highly Branched Cyclic Dextrin is a dextrin produced from enzymatic breaking of the amylopectin in clusters and using branching enzyme to form large cyclic chains.

== See also ==
- Brewing – Process in beer production
- Cellodextrin – Glucose polymers
- Dextrose equivalent – Amount of reducing sugars in a sugar product
- Icodextrin – Pharmaceutical drug
- Modified starch – Thickening agent
- Starch gelatinization – Process of breaking down the intermolecular bonds of starch by water
