= Mercury swivel commutator =

A mercury swivel commutator is a connector mainly used in animal experimentation to prevent the twisting of electrode wires attached to moving animals.

== Application ==
Mercury swivel commutators are typically used in electrophysiological experiments on head-free or moving animals. Whereas electrical recordings from stationary, head-fixed animals can be done with electrodes attached directly with wires to the amplifier and recording setup on a stereotaxtic rig, in freely moving animals a commutator is needed to prevent twisting of the wires attaching the electrode, which moves and rotates with the animal's head (often multiple revolutions in one direction), to the amplifier/recorder, which is in a fixed position.

== Mechanism ==
A mercury swivel commutator is a type of electrical commutator. These traditionally use slip rings for coupling, which can introduce electrical noise into the connection as the contact points slide over the surface of the slip-rings, causing microscopic bumps which result in uneven conductivity. To reduce the electrical noise the contact points need to be pressed against the slip rings with greater force. This leads to resistance when moving the ring, as well as a higher rate of wear. Using liquid mercury as the conductor reduces commutator noise and friction, enabling commutator use for small weaker animals.

== Other uses ==
Many machinery manufacturers have switched to using mercury swivel commutators instead of slip rings. For example, packaging machines have moving parts that are heated to seal packages after they are filled. Slip rings are traditionally used but these can introduce electrical noise and signal degradation into temperature sensing circuit, whereas mercury swivel commutators are more reliable and accurate. Multiple channel mercury swivel commutators also make it possible to pass the power and the temperature signals through the same rotating electrical connector, which has the benefit of minimizing the number of connector parts needed.

== See also ==
- Neuroscience
- Neurophysiology
- Single-unit recording
- Mercury switch
