= Universal motor =

Type of electric motor

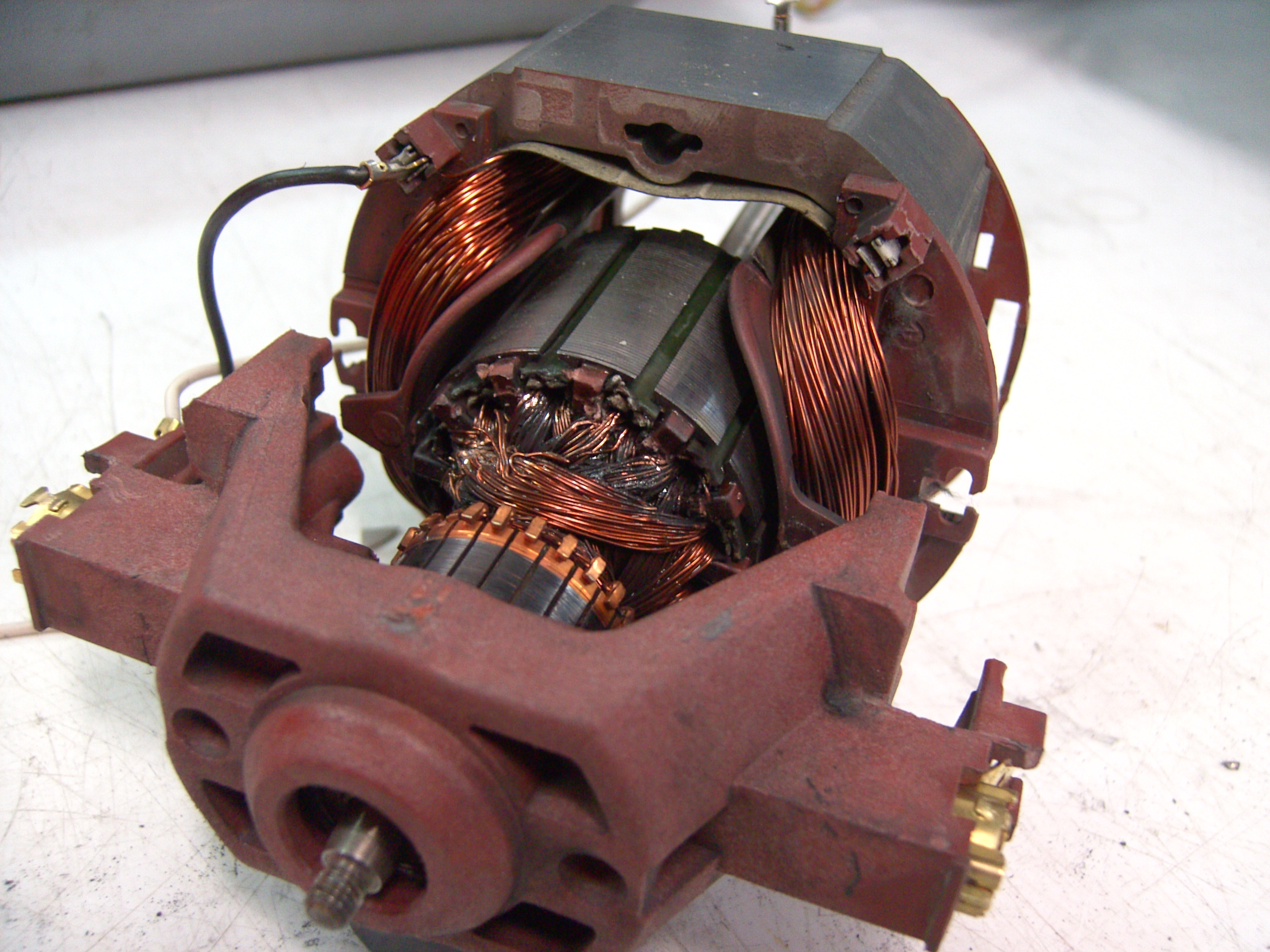
Modern low-cost universal motor, from a vacuum cleaner. Field windings are of copper wire, toward the back on both sides. The rotor's laminated metallic core is gray, with darker slots for winding the coils having high efficiency. The similarly shaped metallic commutator (partly hidden toward the front) has become dark from use. The large brown molded-plastic piece in the foreground supports the brush guides and brushes (both sides), as well as the rear motor bearing.

The universal motor is a type of electric motor that can operate on either AC or DC power and uses an electromagnet as its stator to create its magnetic field. It is a commutated series-wound motor where the stator's field coils are connected in series with the rotor windings through a commutator. It is often referred to as an AC series motor. The universal motor is very similar to a DC series motor in construction, but is modified slightly to allow the motor to operate properly on AC power. This type of electric motor can operate well on AC because the current in both the field coils and the armature (and the resultant magnetic fields) will alternate (reverse polarity) synchronously with the supply. Hence, the resulting mechanical force will occur in a consistent direction of rotation, independent of the direction of applied voltage, but determined by the commutator and polarity of the field coils.

Universal motors have high starting torque, can run at high speed, and are lightweight and compact. They are commonly used in portable power tools and equipment, as well as many household appliances. They are relatively easy to control, either electronically or electromechanically using tapped coils. However, the commutator has brushes that wear, so they are less suitable for equipment that is in continuous use. In addition, partly because of the commutator, universal motors are typically very noisy, both acoustically and electromagnetically.

== Working ==
Universal motors' field coils are series wound with the rotor coils and commutator.

Equivalent circuit

Not all series-wound motors operate well on AC current. (Note: Motors for DC will anyway require laminated rotors, owing to commutation) If an ordinary series-wound DC motor were connected to an AC supply, it would run very poorly. The universal motor is modified in several ways to allow for proper AC supply operation. There is a compensating winding typically added, along with laminated pole pieces, as opposed to the solid pole pieces found in DC motors. A universal motor's armature typically has far more coils and plates than a DC motor, and hence fewer windings per coil. This reduces the inductance.

=== Efficiency ===
Even when used with AC power these types of motors are able to run at a rotation frequency well above that of the mains supply, and because most electric motor properties improve with speed, this means they can be lightweight and powerful. However, universal motors are usually relatively inefficient: around 30% for smaller motors and up to 70–75% for larger ones.

=== Torque–speed characteristics ===
Series-wound electric motors respond to increased load by slowing down; the current increases and the torque rises in proportion to the square of the current because the same current flows in both the armature and the field windings. If the motor is stalled, the current is limited only by the total resistance of the windings and the torque can be very high, and there is a danger of the windings becoming overheated. The counter-EMF aids the armature resistance to limit the current through the armature. When power is first applied to a motor, the armature does not rotate. At that instant, the counter-EMF is zero and the only factor limiting the armature current is the armature resistance. Usually the armature resistance of a motor is low; therefore the current through the armature would be very large when the power is applied. Therefore the need can arise for an additional resistance in series with the armature to limit the current until the motor rotation can build up the counter-EMF. As the motor rotation builds up, the resistance is gradually cut out. The speed-torque characteristic is an almost perfectly straight line between the stall torque and the no-load speed. This suits large inertial loads as the speed will drop until the motor slowly starts to rotate and these motors have a very high stalling torque.

As the speed increases, the inductance of the rotor means that the ideal commutating point changes. Small motors typically have fixed commutation. While some larger universal motors have rotatable commutation, this is rare. Instead larger universal motors often have compensation windings in series with the motor, or sometimes inductively coupled, and placed at ninety electrical degrees to the main field axis. These reduce the reactance of the armature, and improve the commutation.

One useful property of having the field windings in series with the armature winding is that as the speed increases the counter EMF naturally reduces the voltage across, and current through the field windings, giving field weakening at high speeds. This means that the motor has no theoretical maximum speed for any particular applied voltage. Universal motors can be and are generally run at high speeds, 4000–16000 RPM, and can go over 20,000 RPM. By way of contrast, AC synchronous and squirrel-cage induction motors cannot turn a shaft faster than allowed by the power line frequency. In countries with 60 Hz AC supply, this speed is limited to 3600 RPM.

Motor damage may occur from over-speeding (running at a rotational speed in excess of design limits) if the unit is operated with no significant mechanical load. On larger motors, sudden loss of load is to be avoided, and the possibility of such an occurrence is incorporated into the motor's protection and control schemes. In some smaller applications, a fan blade attached to the shaft often acts as an artificial load to limit the motor speed to a safe level, as well as a means to circulate cooling airflow over the armature and field windings. If there were no mechanical limits placed on a universal motor it could theoretically speed out of control in the same way any series-wound DC motor can.

An advantage of the universal motor is that AC supplies may be used on motors which have some characteristics more common in DC motors, specifically high starting torque and very compact design if high running speeds are used.

=== Disadvantages ===
A negative aspect is the maintenance and short life problems caused by the commutator, as well as electromagnetic interference (EMI) issues due to any sparking. Because of the relatively high maintenance commutator brushes, universal motors are best-suited for devices such as food mixers and power tools which are used only intermittently, and often have high starting-torque demands.

Another negative aspect is that these motors may only be used where mostly-clean air is present at all times. Due to the dramatically increased risk of overheating, totally-enclosed fan-cooled universal motors would be impractical, though some have been made. Such a motor would need a large fan to circulate enough air, decreasing efficiency since the motor must use more energy to cool itself. The impracticality comes from the resulting size, weight, and thermal management issues which open motors have none of.

Universal motors are also very noisy compared to other types of AC and DC motors.

=== Speed control ===
Continuous speed control of a universal motor running on AC is easily obtained by use of a thyristor circuit, while multiple taps on the field coil provide (imprecise) stepped speed control. Household blenders that advertise many speeds frequently combine a field coil with several taps and a diode that can be inserted in series with the motor (causing the motor to run on half-wave rectified AC).

== Variations ==
=== Shunt winding ===
Universal motors are series wound. Shunt winding was used experimentally, in the late 19th century, but was impractical owing to problems with commutation. Various schemes of embedded resistance, inductance, and antiphase cross-coupling were attempted to reduce this. Universal motors, including shunt wound, were favoured as AC motors at this time as they were self-starting. When self-starting induction motors and automatic starters became available, these replaced the larger universal motors (above 1 hp) and the shunt wound.

=== Repulsion-start ===
In the past, repulsion-start wound-rotor motors provided high starting torque, but with added complexity. Their rotors were similar to those of universal motors, but their brushes were connected only to each other. Transformer action induced current into the rotor. Brush position relative to field poles meant that starting torque was developed by rotor repulsion from the field poles. A centrifugal mechanism, when close to running speed, connected all commutator bars together to create the equivalent of a squirrel-cage rotor. As well, when close to approximately 80 percent of its run speed, these motors can run as induction motors.

== Applications ==
=== Domestic appliances ===
Operating at normal power line frequencies, universal motors are often found in a range less than 1000 watts. Their high speed makes them useful for appliances such as blenders, vacuum cleaners, and hair dryers where high speed and light weight are desirable. They are also commonly used in portable power tools, such as drills, sanders, circular saws, and jigsaws, where the motor's characteristics work well. An added benefit for power tools used by welders is that classic engine-driven welding machines may be a pure DC generator, and their auxiliary power receptacles will still be DC, even though a typical NEMA 5-15 household configuration. The DC power is fine for typical jobsite (outmoded) incandescent lighting and the universal motors in some drills and grinders. Many vacuum cleaner and weed trimmer motors exceed 10,000 RPM, while many Dremel and similar miniature grinders exceed 30,000 RPM.

Universal motors also lend themselves to electronic speed control and, as such, were an ideal choice for domestic washing machines. The motor can be used to agitate the drum (both forward and in reverse) by switching the field winding with respect to the armature. The motor can also be run up to the high speeds required for the spin cycle. Nowadays, variable-frequency drive motors are more commonly used instead.

=== Rail traction ===
Universal motors also formed the basis of the traditional railway traction motor in electric railways. In this application, the use of AC to power a motor originally designed to run on DC would lead to efficiency losses due to eddy current heating of their magnetic components, particularly the motor field pole-pieces that, for DC, would have used solid (un-laminated) iron. Although the heating effects are reduced by using laminated pole-pieces, as used for the cores of transformers and by the use of laminations of high-permeability electrical steel, one solution available at the start of the 20th century was for the motors to be operated from very-low-frequency AC supplies, with 25 Hz and 16 2/3 Hz operation being common.

=== Starter motor ===
Starters of combustion engines are usually universal motors, with the advantage of being small and having high torque at low speed. Some starters have permanent magnets, others have one of the four poles wound with a shunt coil rather than series-wound coils.
