= Slip ring =

Electromechanical device

Sketch of a cross-section of slip rings for an electric motor. In this example, the slip rings have a brush-lifting device and a sliding contact bar, allowing the slip-rings to be short-circuited when no longer required. This can be used in starting a slip-ring induction motor, for example.

A slip ring or collector ring is an electromechanical device that allows the transmission of power and electrical signals from a stationary to a rotating structure. A slip ring can be used in any electromechanical system that requires rotation while transmitting power or signals. It can improve mechanical performance, simplify system operation and eliminate damage-prone wires dangling from movable joints.

Also called rotary electrical interfaces, rotating electrical connectors, collectors, swivels, or electrical rotary joints, these rings are commonly found in slip ring motors, electrical generators for alternating current (AC) systems and alternators and in packaging machinery, cable reels, and wind turbines. They can be used on any rotating object to transfer power, control circuits, or analog or digital signals including data such as those found on aerodrome beacons, rotating tanks, power shovels, radio telescopes, telemetry systems, heliostats or ferris wheels.

A slip ring (in electrical engineering terms) is a method of making an electrical connection through a rotating assembly. Formally, it is an electric transmission device that allows energy flow between two electrical rotating parts, such as in a motor.

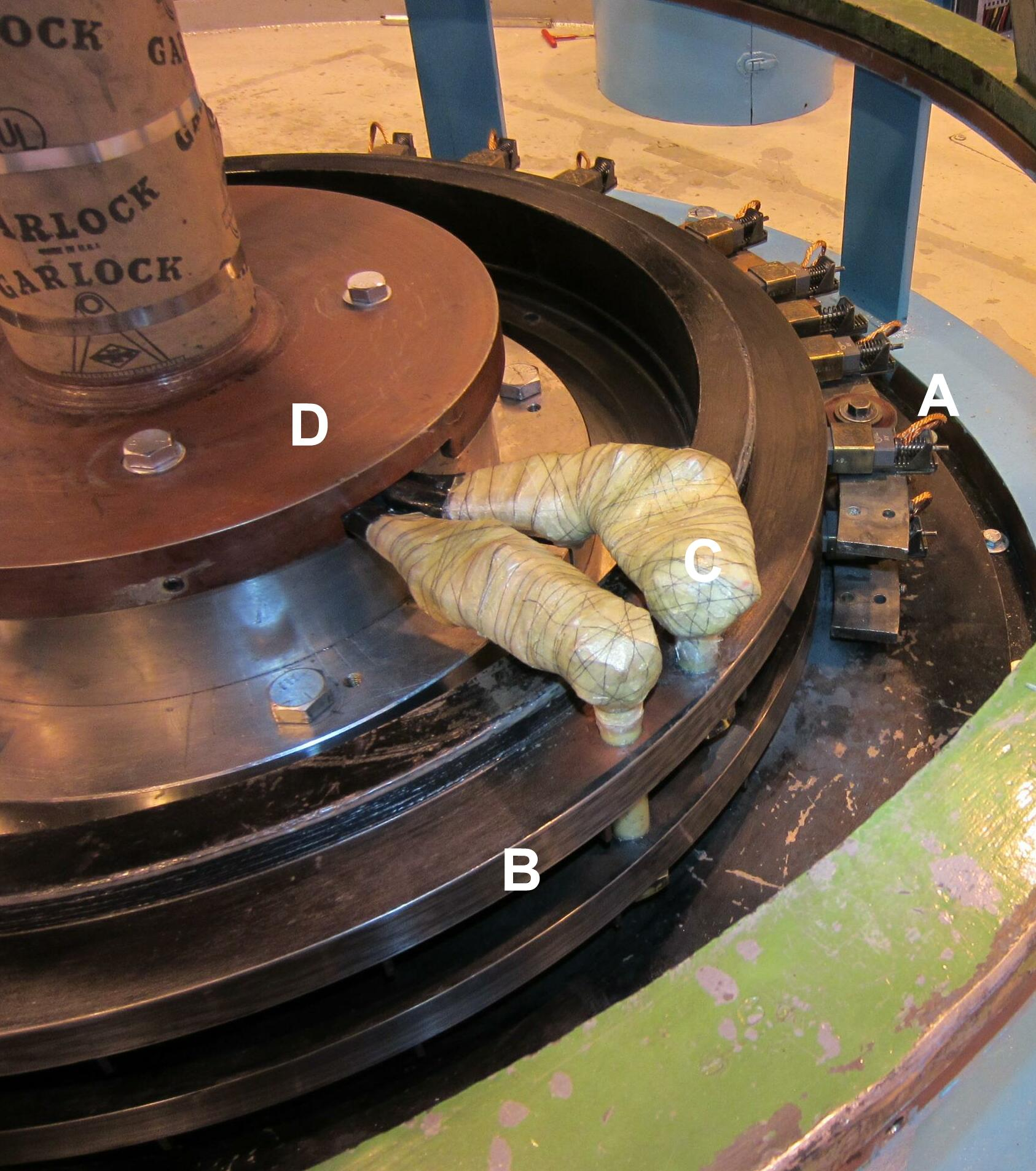
Slip rings on a hydroelectric generator: A - stationary spring-loaded graphite brushes B - rotating steel contact ring C - insulated connections to generator field winding D - top end of generator shaft

== Composition ==
Typically, a slip ring consists of a stationary graphite or metal contact (brush) which rubs on the outside diameter of a rotating metal ring. As the metal ring turns, the electric current or signal is conducted through the stationary brush to the metal ring making the connection. Additional ring/brush assemblies are stacked along the rotating axis if more than one electrical circuit is needed. Either the brushes or the rings are stationary and the other component rotates. This simple design has been used for decades as a rudimentary method of passing current into a rotating device.

== Alternative names and uses ==
Some other names used for slip ring are collector ring, rotary electrical contact and electrical slip ring. Some people also use the term commutator; however, commutators are somewhat different and are specialized for use on DC motors and generators. While commutators are segmented, slip rings are continuous, and the terms are not interchangeable. Rotary transformers are often used instead of slip rings in high-speed or low-friction environments.

A slip ring can be used within a rotary union to function concurrently with the device, commonly referred to as a rotary joint. Slip rings do the same for electrical power and signal that rotary unions do for fluid media. They are often integrated into rotary unions to send power and data to and from rotating machinery in conjunction with the media that the rotary union provides.

== History ==
The basic principle of slip rings can be traced back to the late 19th century when they were initially used in early electrical experiments and the development of electrical generators and motors. With the advent of the Industrial Revolution and the increasing demand for electrical power, the technology behind slip rings started to evolve. They became essential components in large-scale electrical machinery, such as turbines and generators, allowing for the transfer of power and signals in machines where a part of the machinery needed to rotate continuously.

== Types ==
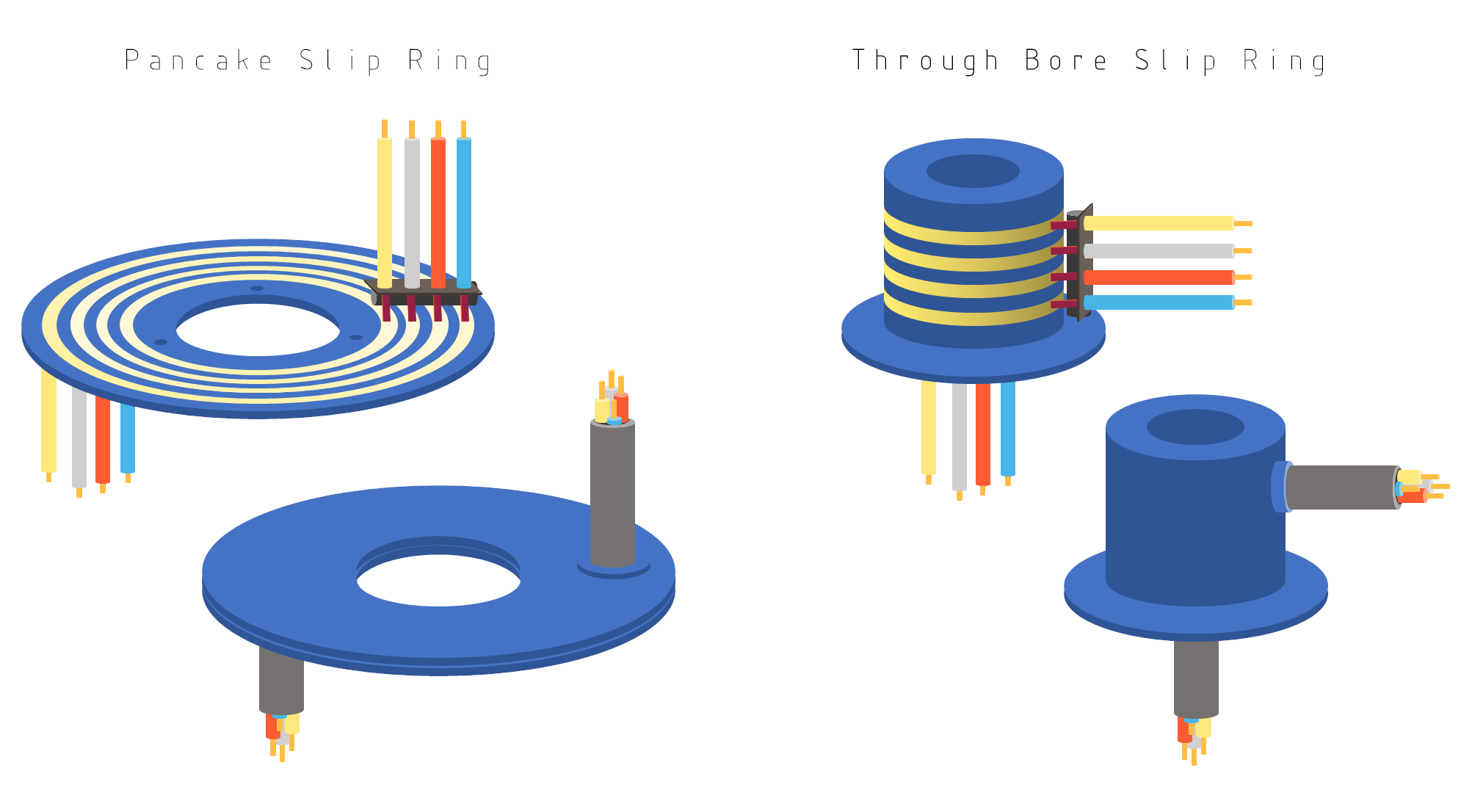
The two most common types of slip ring

Slip rings are made in various types and sizes; one device made for theatrical stage lighting, for example, had 100 conductors. The slip ring allows for unlimited rotations of the connected object, whereas a slack cable can only be twisted a few times before it will bind up and restrict rotation.

=== Mercury-wetted slip rings ===
Mercury-wetted slip rings, noted for their low resistance and stable connection use a different principle which replaces the sliding brush contact with a pool of liquid metal molecularly bonded to the contacts. During rotation the liquid metal maintains the electrical connection between the stationary and rotating contacts. However, the use of mercury can pose safety concerns if not properly handled, as it is a toxic substance. The slip ring device is also limited by temperature, as mercury solidifies at approximately -40 °C.

=== Pancake slip rings ===
A pancake slip ring has the conductors arranged on a flat disc as concentric rings centered on the rotating shaft. This configuration has greater weight and volume for the same circuits, greater capacitance and crosstalk, greater brush wear and more readily collects wear debris on its vertical axis. However, a pancake offers reduced axial length for the number of circuits, and so may be appropriate in some applications.

=== Wireless slip rings ===
Wireless slip rings do not rely on the typical friction-based metal and carbon brush contact methods that have been employed by slip rings since their invention, such as those explored above. Instead, they transfer both power and data wirelessly via a magnetic field, which is created by the coils that are placed in the rotating receiver, and the stationary transmitter. Wireless slip rings are considered an upgrade from — or alternative to — traditional slip rings, as their lack of standard mechanical rotating parts means they are typically more resilient in harsh operating environments and require less maintenance. However, the amount of power that can be transmitted between coils is limited; typically a traditional contact-type slip ring can transmit orders of magnitude more power in the same volume.

== See also ==
- Detangler, a bicycle component allowing unlimited rotation of the handlebar without tangling the cables
