= Edme-Jean Baptiste Bouillon-Lagrange =

French chemist and pharmacist (1764–1844)

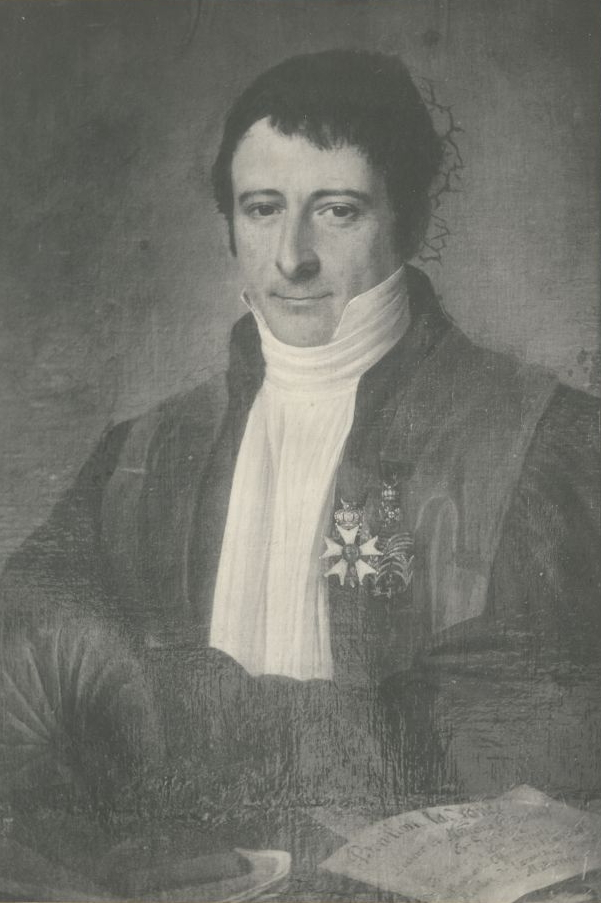

Edme-Jean Baptiste Bouillon-Lagrange (12 July 1764, Paris – 23 August 1844) was a French chemist and pharmacist. He was a professor of chemistry at the École supérieure de pharmacie de Paris, later serving as director of the school.

He was owner of a pharmacy on Rue Saint-Martin in Paris. Being influenced by Antoine François Fourcroy and Claude Louis Berthollet, in 1789 he began devoting his time and energies to chemical research. Subsequently, he became an instructor at the Ecole de pharmacie in Paris.

He served as a military pharmacist during the Napoleonic campaigns. In 1806 he obtained his medical doctorate from the University of Strasbourg, afterwards serving as a personal physician to Empress Josephine. He had spent twelve years as director of the Ecole de pharmacie at the time of his death on 23 August 1844, aged 80.

His studies in the field of chemistry involved investigations of truffles, willow bark, ambergris, garlic, starch, sea water, milk, etc.

== Written works ==
- Cours d'étude pharmaceutique, 1794.
- Herrn B. Lagrange Vollständige Apothekerwissenschaft : aus dem Französischen übersetzt . Vol. 1;3&4 . Baumgärtner, Leipzig 1796-1797 Digital edition by the University and State Library Düsseldorf
- Manuel d'un cours de chimie, ou, Principes élémentaires, théoriques et pratiques de cette science, 1801, translated into English and published as "A manual of a course of chemistry; or, A series of experiments and illustrations, necessary to form a complete course of that science".
- Manuel du pharmacien, 1803.
- Essai sur les eaux minérales, naturelles et artificielles, 1810.
