= Brush (electric) =

Electrical contact that conducts current

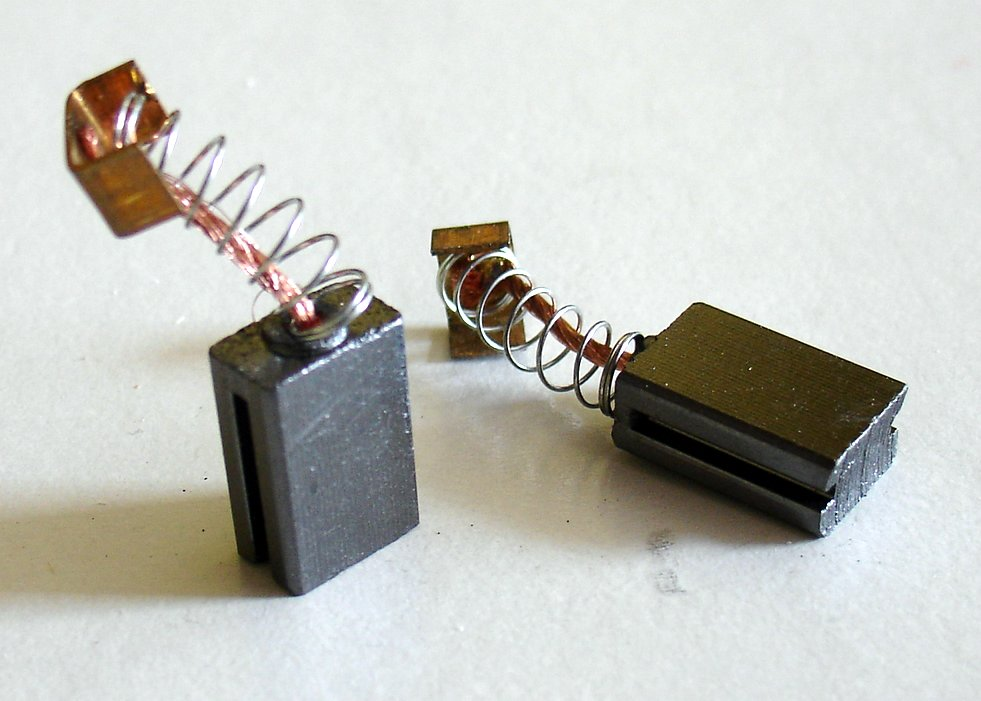
A pair of carbon brushes

A brush or carbon brush is an electrical contact, often made from specially prepared carbon, which conducts current between stationary and rotating parts (the latter most commonly being a rotating shaft) of an electrical machine. Typical applications include electric motors, alternators and electric generators. The lifespan of a carbon brush depends on how much the motor is used, and how much power is put through the motor.

== Etymology ==
For certain types of electric motors or generators to function, the coils of the rotor must be connected to complete an electrical circuit. Originally this was accomplished by affixing a copper or brass commutator or 'slip ring' to the shaft, with springs pressing braided copper wire 'brushes' onto the slip rings or commutator which conduct the current. Such brushes arced and even welded as the commutator rotated, because the brush short-circuited adjacent segments.

The cure was the introduction of 'high resistance brushes' made from graphite (sometimes with added copper). Although the resistance was of the order of tens of milliohms, they were of high enough resistance to provide a gradual shift of current from one commutator segment to the next.

Carbon brushes are available in four main grade categories: carbon graphite, electrographitic, graphite, and metal graphite. The term brush remains in use. Since the brushes wear out, they can be replaced in products intended to allow maintenance.

During World War II, high–altitude aircraft generators had very rapid brush wear, requiring reformulated brush compounds for acceptable life.

Metal fiber brushes are currently being developed. They may have advantages over current brush technology, but have not yet seen wide implementation.

== Manufacturing process ==
=== Mixing components ===
Exact composition of the brush depends on the application. Graphite/carbon powder is commonly used. Copper is used for better conductance (rare for AC applications). In order to maximize electrical conductivity and green strength, highly dendritic (electrolytic) copper powder is used. Binders, mostly phenol or other resins or pitch, are mixed in so the powder holds its shape when compacted. Other additives include metal powders, and solid lubricants like MoS_{2}, WS_{2}. Much know-how and research is needed in order to define a brush grade mixture for each application or motor.

=== Compacting the mixture ===
The brush compound is compacted in a tool consisting of upper and lower punch and die, on mechanical or hydraulic presses. In this step, depending on later processing, the copper wire (called shunt wire) can be inserted automatically through a hole in the upper punch and fixed into the pressed brush block by the powder pressed around. This operation, called "tamping", is usually performed using electrolytic copper powder, possibly with silver coating for some high performance applications. After this process, the brush is still very fragile and in professional jargon called a 'green brush'.

=== Firing of green brushes ===
Next follows heat treatment of the "green brushes" under artificial atmosphere (usually hydrogen and nitrogen). Temperatures range up to 1200 °C. This process is called sintering or baking. During sintering, the binders either burn off or carbonize and form a crystalline structure between the carbon, copper and other additives. Baking is followed by graphitization (heat treatment). The heat treatment is transformed by a temperature curve exactly defined for each material mixture. Besides the mixture composition, the used temperature curve is the second big “secret” of each brush manufacturer. After the heat treatment, the brush structure is modified in a way which makes copying of the brush nearly impossible for competing companies.

=== Secondary operations ===
Sintering causes the brushes to shrink and to bend. They must be ground to net shape. Some companies use additional treatments in order to make the brush more durable by methods such as impregnation of the running surface by special oils, resins and grease.

Manufacturing of carbon brushes requires an in-depth knowledge of materials and experience in mixture compositions. Very small changes in brush contents by just a few percent of components by weight can significantly change the properties of brushes on their applications. There are just a handful of brush developing companies in the world, which are mostly specialized on certain types of brushes.

Carbon brushes are one of the least costly parts in an electric motor. On the other hand, they usually are the key part which delivers the durability (“life-time”) and performance to the motor they are used in. Their production requires very high attention to quality control and production process control throughout all steps of the production process.

== Liquid metal brushes ==
From time to time the use of liquid metals to make contacts is researched. Drawbacks to this approach include the need to contain the liquid metal (as it is usually toxic or corrosive) and power losses from induction and turbulence.

== See also ==
- Commutator (electric) § Brush construction
- Slip ring
