= Green strength =

Green strength, or handling strength, can be defined as the strength of a material as it is processed to form its final ultimate tensile strength. This strength is usually considerably lower than the final ultimate strength of a material. The term green strength is usually referenced when discussing non-metallic materials such as adhesives and elastomers (such as rubber). Recently, it has also been referenced in metallurgy applications such as powdered metallurgy.

== Adhesives ==
A joint made through the use of an adhesive can be referred to as an adhesive joint or bond.

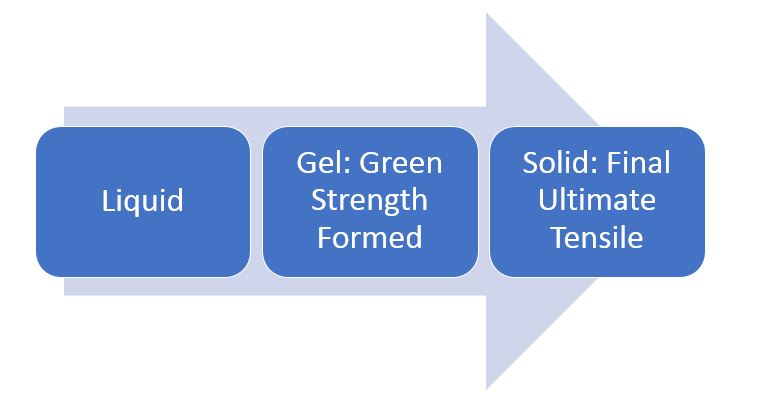
Phases of Epoxy

The green strength of adhesives is the early development of bond strength of an adhesive. It indicated "that the adhesive bond is strong enough to be handled a short time after the adherents are mated but much before full cure is obtained." Usually, this strength is significantly lower than the final curing strength. Most adhesives typically have an initial green strength and a final ultimate tensile strength listed for their application. For household adhesives, this data is usually reflected on the packaging.

The best example of this is seen in typical epoxies from a local hardware stores. During curing, the epoxy will travel into an initial curing phase, also called "green phase", when it begins to gel. At that point, the epoxy is no longer workable and will move from being tacky to a firm rubber-like texture. While the epoxy is only partially cured at this point, it has formed a lower green strength. Normally, this process occurs within 30 minutes to 1 hour. At this time, the part in question can be handled, but cannot handle large loads or stress. It typically takes up to 24 hours for a standard epoxy to cure to its final and complete strength.

Temperature is an important factor in the time it takes for an adhesive to form the green strength. While this can vary from adhesive to adhesive, general speaking, heat can speed up the process to form the green strength and the overall curing time. Time-Temperature-Transformation Diagrams exist for various adhesives that relate the time and temperature to the state of the adhesive during curing. This allows for a proper understanding of when the green strength will be reached for an adhesive joint based on certain conditions.

=== Testing ===
Mechanical testing can be used to verify the green strength of a material. This will allow the user the understand the amount of load that can be applied in the green phase before final cure.

Tensile loading can be verified by various testing methods. Multiple ASTM specifications exist for the tensile testing of adhesives that are relatively easy to follow. Such tests include the process of attaching the adhesive to two adherents (typically wood or steel) then testing the joint with a pull-type test. One example is the use us ASTM Test Method D2095. In this test, two metal rod ends are polished so it contains no burrs that could affect the adhesive bond. It also machined so the surfaces are perfectly parallel. The rods are then butted against each with the adhesive joining them. As it cures and sets, the fulfillment of green strength can be tested by a pull test, putting the bond in full tension load.

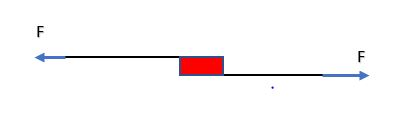
Example of Lap Shear Joint in Load

Shear loading can also be tested in respect to green strength. Most adhesive bonds used in design require the bond to typically be in a state of shear, not tensile. Because of this, it is very important to understand the shear loading of a joint in relation to its green strength and final strength. Just like in tensile loading, ASTM provides very specific testing methods for a joint in shear loading.

The standard lap shear specimen test is described in ASTM D1002. This test is the single common and discussed test method for adhesive bonds. In this method, the surface is prepped and cleaned for each specimen. The adhesive is then applied to the area that will be lapped. This lap length is generally 0.5" and the bond width is 1". The bond is then fixed and allowed to cure. For green strength testing, the fixture can be removed, at the appropriate time, and the specimen can be loaded in shear until it finally fails. This will verify the green strength of the material.

Other testing, such as cleavage loading and peel test, can be used to determine both the green strength and final strength of a material. These are typically not reflected on the data sheet for standard adhesives, but can be used for testing of adhesives based on their applications in residential and commercial environments.

== Elastomers ==
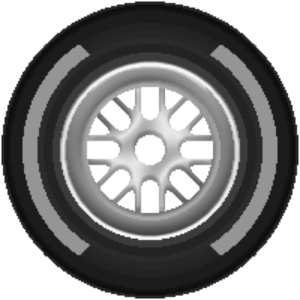
Rubber Tire (Elastomer)

In the elastomer industry, green strength describes the strength of an elastomer in an unvulcanized, uncured state. The most popular referenced type of elastomer is rubber.

For rubber composites, green strength is essential during formation and manufacturing of materials such as radial tires, tank tracks, etc. These rubbers must be stretched from one mill to another during processing to form the final, vulcanized product. Green strength allows these transfers without tearing or wrinkling the workpiece.

To improve the green strength of elastomers and prevent issues during forming, various additives and compounds are typically added to the composite. Also, fabrication and forming techniques have been modified to reduce the amount of stress on the material before it is vulcanized. These techniques are a pertinent component of the tire making industry because it is a process that requires much forming, stretching, and bending during fabrication before the final curing is complete.

== Metals ==
Green strength of metals is a concept employed in the field of powder metallurgy.

Powder metallurgy refers to the fabrication of materials or components from powders. In powder metallurgy, the initial green strength is formed during compacting and forming. Increased complexity of parts and geometry have created a need for a higher green strength during this process.

There are several limitations that restrict the ability to increase green strength in powder metallurgy components. Characteristics such as particle size and compressibility pose limits on the final green strength.

Various studies have been undertaken to improve the green strength of powder metallurgy. The use of advanced lubricants and the addition of high alloys have shown that it is possible to increase the green strength of these materials.
