= Dielectric withstand test =

Test to ensure electrical insulators work under required conditions

In electrical engineering, a dielectric withstand test (also pressure test, high potential test, hipot test, or insulation test) is an electrical safety test performed on a component or product to determine the effectiveness of its insulation. The test may be between mutually insulated sections of a part, or energized parts and ground. The test is a means to qualify a device's ability to operate safely during rated electrical conditions. If the current through a device under test is less than a specified limit at the required test potential and time duration, the device meets the dielectric withstand requirement. A dielectric withstand test may be done as a factory test on new equipment, or may be done on apparatus already in service as a routine maintenance test.

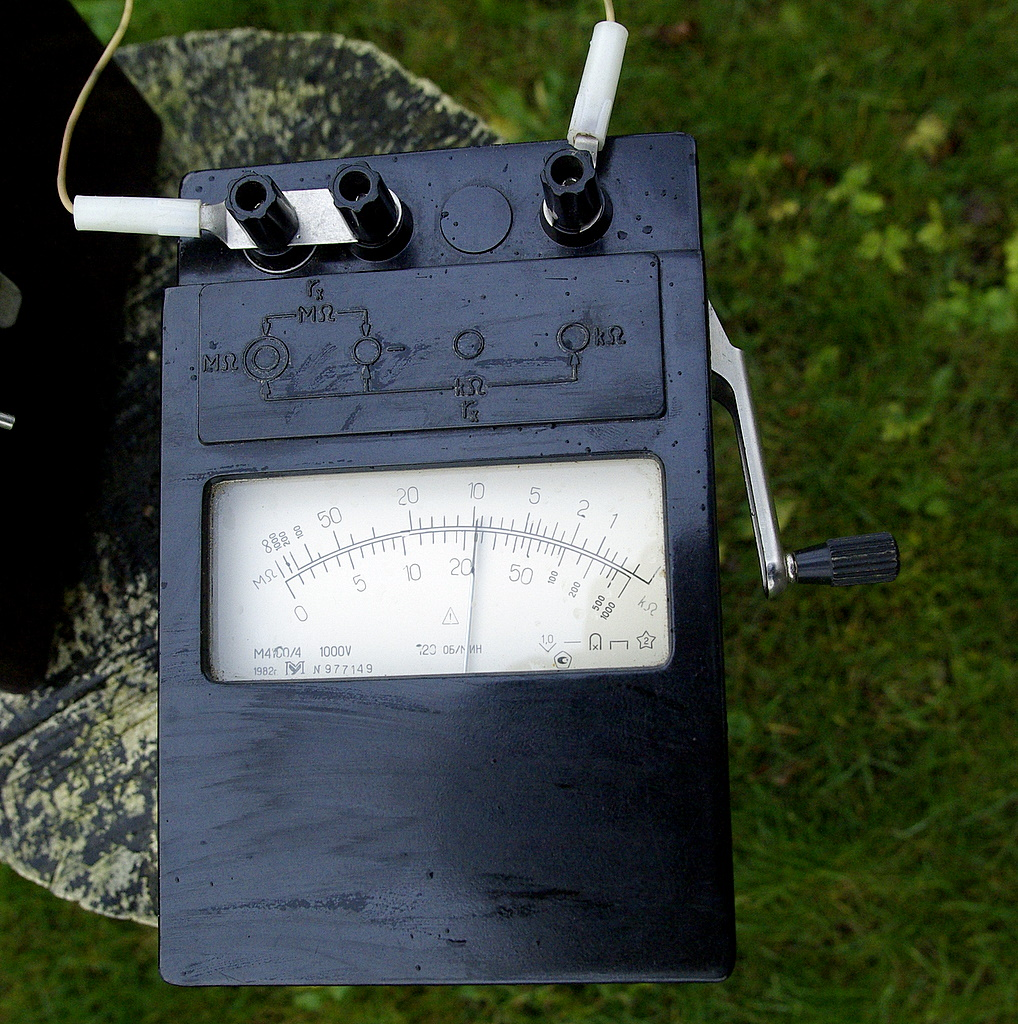
An insulation test set; in this pattern, a hand-cranked generator provides the high voltage and the scale is directly calibrated in megohms.

Voltage withstand testing is done with a high-voltage source and voltage and current meters. A single instrument called a "pressure test set" or "hipot tester" is often used to perform this test. It applies the necessary voltages to a device and monitors leakage current. The current can trip a fault indicator. The tester has output overload protection. The test voltage may be either direct current or alternating current at power frequency or other frequency, like resonant frequency (30 to 300 Hz determined by load) or VLF (0.01 Hz to 0.1 Hz), when convenient. The maximum voltage is given in the test standard for the particular product. The application rate may also be adjusted to manage leakage currents resulting from inherent capacitive effects of the test object. The duration of the test is dependent on the test requirements of the asset owner but is normally up to 5 minutes. The applied voltage, rate of application and test duration depend on the specification requirements of the equipment. Different test standards apply for consumer electronics, military electrical devices, high-voltage cables, switchgear and other apparatus.

Typical hipot equipment leakage current trip limit settings range between 0.1 and 20 mA and are set by the user according to test object characteristics and rate of voltage application. The objective is to choose a current setting that will not cause the tester to falsely trip during voltage application, while at the same time, selecting a value that minimizes possible damage to the device under test should an inadvertent discharge or breakdown occur.

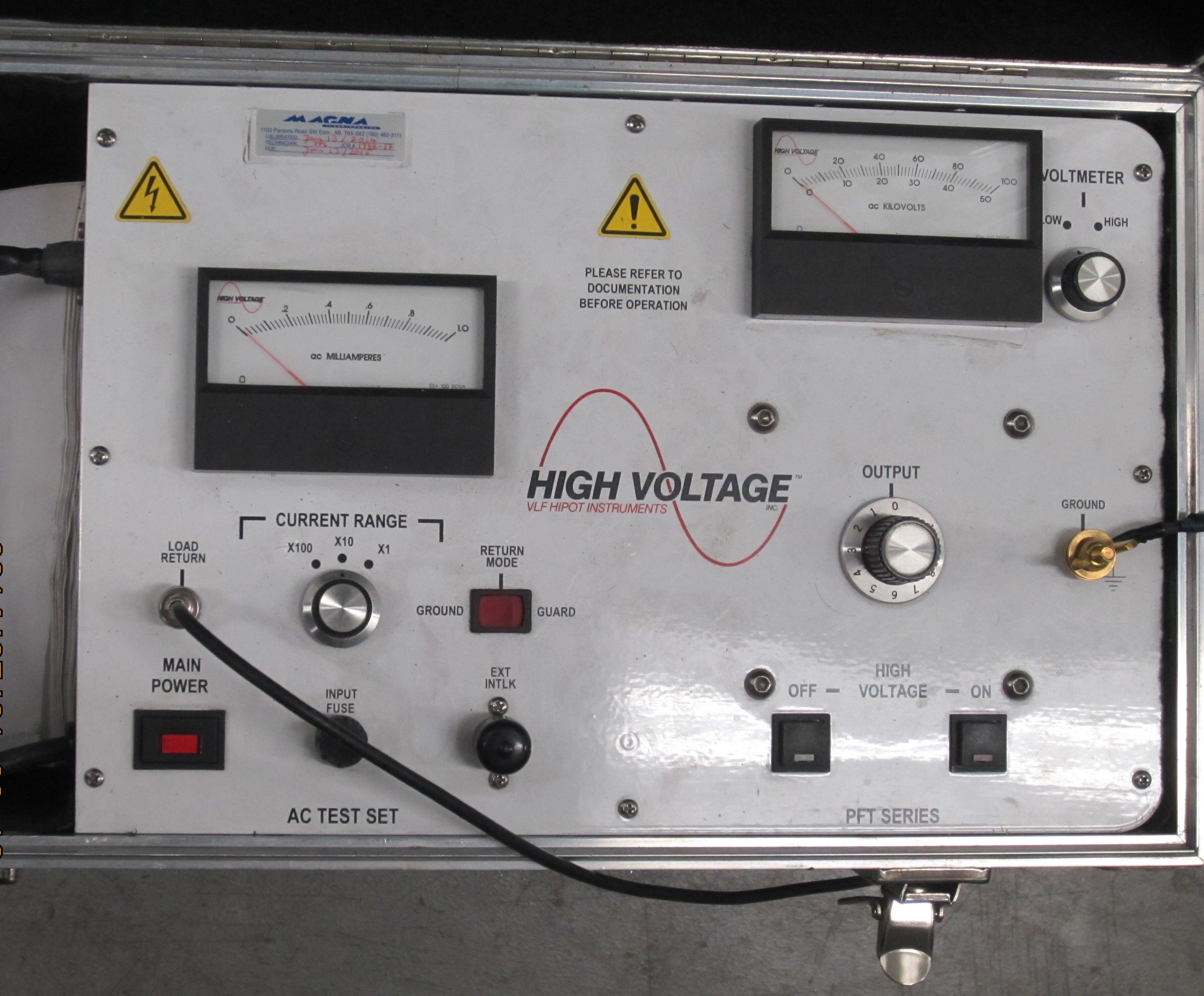
Control panel of a portable high voltage ("hipot") tester; this instrument can test up to 100 kV AC

== See also ==
- Burn-in
- Dielectric
- Dielectric loss
- Electrical breakdown
- Electrical isolation test
- Impulse generator
- VLF cable testing
- Wet leakage current test
