= Alternator =

Device converting mechanical into electrical energy

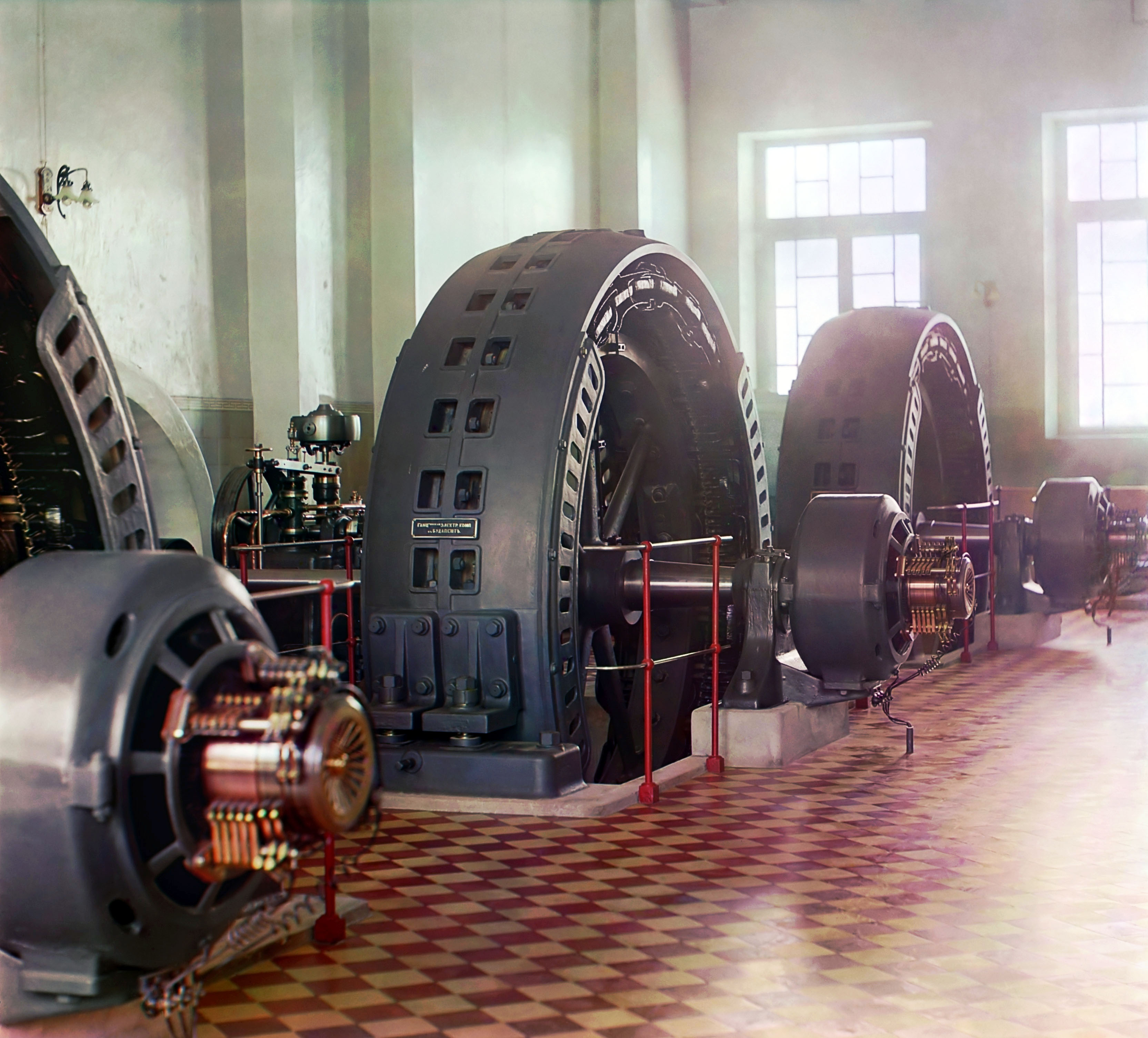
Alternators made in 1909 by Ganz Works in the power generating hall of a Russian hydroelectric station (photograph by Prokudin-Gorsky, 1911).

An alternator (or synchronous generator) is an electrical generator that converts mechanical energy to electrical energy in the form of alternating current (AC). For reasons of cost and simplicity, most alternators use a rotating magnetic field with a stationary armature. The rotor coil is externally excited by a small direct current (DC), while the AC is generated in the stationary coils. Occasionally, a linear alternator or a rotating armature with a stationary magnetic field is used. Although any AC electrical generator might be called an alternator, usually the term refers to small rotating machines driven by automotive and other internal combustion engines. The term usually applies those types with externally excited rotor coils. An alternator that uses a permanent magnet for its magnetic field is called a magneto.

Alternators in power stations driven by steam turbines are called turbo-alternators. Large 50 or 60 Hz three-phase alternators in power plants generate most of the world's electric power, which is distributed by electric power grids.

== History ==
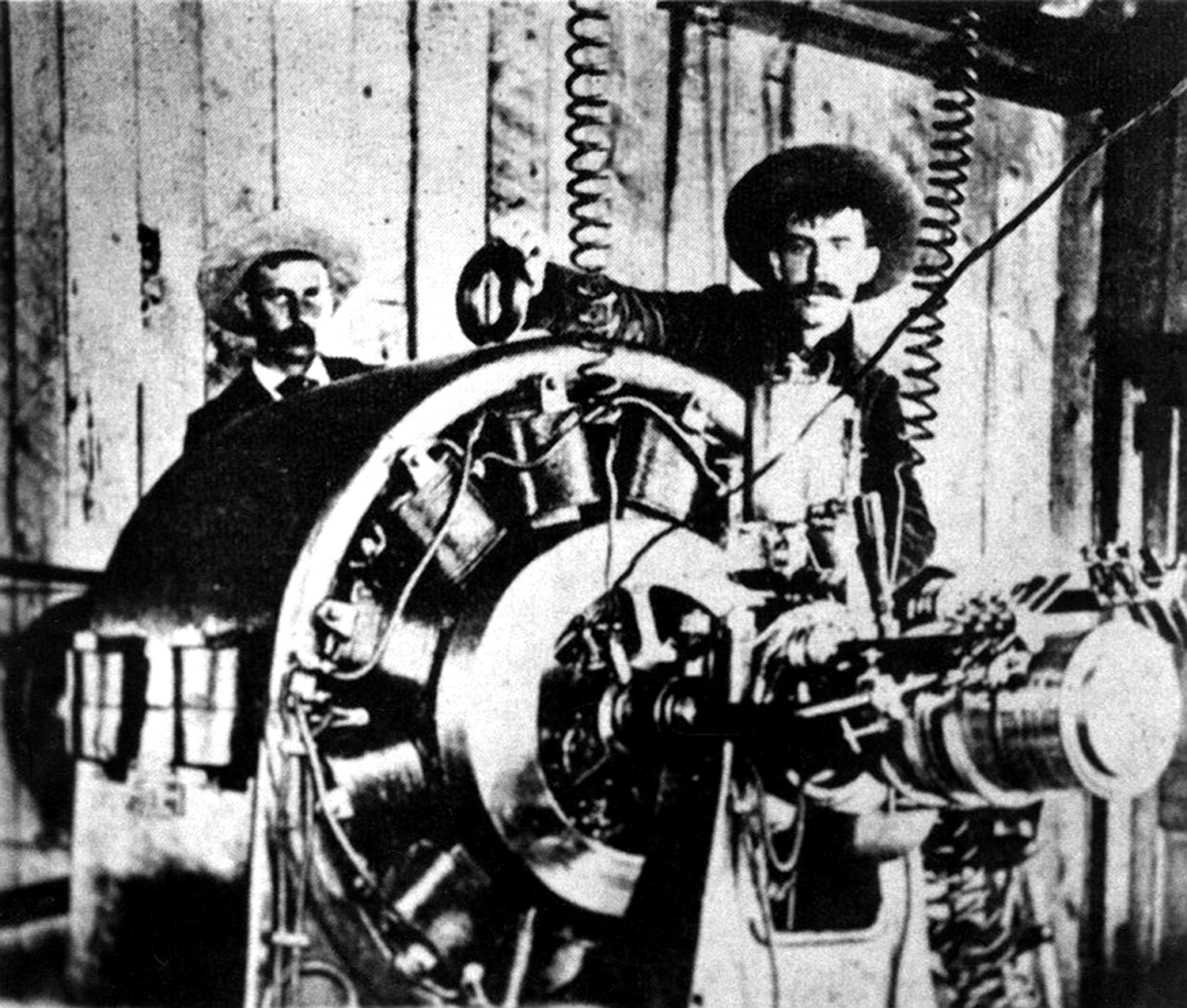
In what is considered the first industrial use of alternating current in 1891, workers pose with a Westinghouse alternator at the Ames Hydroelectric Generating Plant. This machine was used as a generator producing 3,000-volt, 133-hertz, single-phase AC, and an identical machine 3 miles (4.8 km) away was used as an AC motor.

Alternating current generating systems were known in simple forms from the discovery of the magnetic induction of electric current in the 1830s. Rotating generators naturally produced alternating current, but since there was little use for it, it was normally converted into direct current via the addition of a commutator in the generator. The early machines were developed by pioneers such as Michael Faraday and Hippolyte Pixii. Faraday developed the "rotating rectangle", whose operation was heteropolar – each active conductor passed successively through regions where the magnetic field was in opposite directions. Lord Kelvin and Sebastian Ferranti also developed early alternators, producing frequencies between 100 and 300 Hz.

The late 1870s saw the introduction of the first large-scale electrical systems with central generation stations to power Arc lamps, used to light whole streets, factory yards, or the interior of large warehouses. Some, such as Yablochkov arc lamps introduced in 1878, ran better on alternating current, and the development of these early AC generating systems was accompanied by the first use of the word "alternator". Supplying the proper amount of voltage from generating stations in these early systems was left up to the engineer's skill in "riding the load".

In 1883 the Ganz Works invented the constant voltage generator that could produce a stated output voltage, regardless of the value of the actual load. The introduction of transformers in the mid-1880s led to the widespread use of alternating current and the use of alternators needed to produce it.

After 1891, polyphase alternators were introduced to supply currents of multiple differing phases. Later alternators were designed for various alternating current frequencies between sixteen and about one hundred hertz for use with arc lighting, incandescent lighting, and electric motors. Specialized radio frequency alternators like the Alexanderson alternator were developed as longwave radio transmitters around World War 1 and used in a few high power wireless telegraphy stations before vacuum tube transmitters replaced them.

== Principle of operation ==
Diagram of a simple alternator with a rotating magnetic core (rotor) and stationary wire (stator) also showing the current induced in the stator by the rotating magnetic field of the rotor.

A conductor moving relative to a magnetic field develops an electromotive force (EMF) in it (Faraday's Law). This EMF reverses its polarity when it moves under magnetic poles of opposite polarity. Typically, a rotating magnet, called the rotor, turns within a stationary set of conductors, called the stator, wound in coils on an iron core. The field cuts across the conductors, generating an induced EMF (electromotive force), as the mechanical input causes the rotor to turn.

The rotating magnetic field induces an AC voltage in the stator windings. Since the currents in the stator windings vary in step with the position of the rotor, an alternator is a synchronous generator.

The rotor's magnetic field may be produced by permanent magnets or by a field coil electromagnet. Automotive alternators use a rotor winding, which allows control of the alternator's generated voltage by varying the current in the rotor field winding. Permanent magnet machines avoid the loss due to magnetizing current in the rotor, but are restricted in size due to the cost of the magnet material. Since the permanent magnet field is constant, the terminal voltage varies directly with the speed of the generator. Brushless AC generators are usually larger than those used in automotive applications.

An automatic voltage control device controls the field current to keep the output voltage constant. If the output voltage from the stationary armature coils drops due to an increase in demand, more current is fed into the rotating field coils through the voltage regulator (VR). This increases the magnetic field around the field coils, which induces a greater voltage in the armature coils. Thus, the output voltage is brought back up to its original value.

Alternators used in central power stations also control the field current to regulate reactive power and to help stabilize the power system against the effects of momentary faults. Often, there are three sets of stator windings, physically offset so that the rotating magnetic field produces a three-phase current, displaced by one-third of a period with respect to each other.

== Synchronous speeds ==
One cycle of alternating current is produced each time a pair of field poles passes over a point on the stationary winding. The relation between speed and frequency is $N = 120f/P$, where $f$ is the frequency in Hz (cycles per second). $P$ is the number of poles (2, 4, 6, ...), and $N$ is the rotational speed in revolutions per minute (r/min). Old descriptions of alternating current systems sometimes give the frequency in terms of alternations per minute, counting each half-cycle as one alternation; so 12,000 alternations per minute corresponds to 100 Hz.

An alternator's output frequency depends on the number of poles and the rotational speed. The speed corresponding to a particular frequency is called the synchronous speed. This table gives some examples:

Poles	Rotation speed (r/min), giving...		
Poles	50 Hz	60 Hz	400 Hz
2	3,000	3,600	24,000
4	1,500	1,800	12,000
6	1,000	1,200	8,000
8	750	900	6,000
10	600	720	4,800
12	500	600	4,000
14	428.6	514.3	3,429
16	375	450	3,000
18	333.3	400	2,667
20	300	360	2,400
40	150	180	1,200

== Classifications ==
Alternators may be classified by the method of excitation, number of phases, the type of rotation, cooling method, and their application.

=== By excitation ===
There are two main ways to produce the magnetic field used in the alternators: by using permanent magnets, which create their persistent magnetic field, or by using field coils. The alternators that use permanent magnets are specifically called magnetos. In other alternators, wound field coils form an electromagnet to produce the rotating magnetic field. A device that uses permanent magnets to produce alternating current is called a permanent magnet alternator (PMA). A permanent magnet generator (PMG) may produce either alternating current or direct current if it has a commutator.

==== Direct-connected direct-current (DC) generator ====
This method of excitation consists of a smaller direct-current (DC) generator fixed on the same shaft as the alternator. The DC generator generates a small amount of electricity, just enough to excite the field coils of the connected alternator to generate electricity. A variation of this system is a type of alternator that uses direct current from a battery for initial excitation upon start-up, after which the alternator becomes self-excited.

==== Direct-connected alternating-current (AC) generator ====
This method of excitation consists of a smaller alternating-current (AC) generator fixed on the same shaft as the alternator. The AC stator generates a small amount of field coil excitation current, which is induced in the rotor and rectified to DC by a bridge rectifier built in to the windings where it excites the field coils of the larger connected alternator to generate electricity. This system has the advantage of not requiring brushes, which increases service life, although with a slightly lower overall efficiency. A variation of this system is a type of alternator that uses direct current from a battery for initial excitation upon start-up, after which the alternator becomes self-excited.

==== Transformation and rectification ====
This method depends on residual magnetism retained in the iron core to generate a weak magnetic field, which would allow a weak voltage to be generated. This voltage is used to excite the field coils so the alternator can generate stronger voltage as part of its build up process. After the initial AC voltage buildup, the field is supplied with rectified voltage from the alternator.

==== Brushless alternators ====
A brushless alternator is composed of two alternators built end-to-end on one shaft. Until 1966, alternators used brushes with rotating field. With the advancement in semiconductor technology, brushless alternators are possible. Smaller brushless alternators may look like one unit, but the two parts are readily identifiable in the large versions. The main alternator is the larger of the two sections, and the smaller one is the exciter. The exciter has stationary field coils and a rotating armature (power coils). The main alternator uses the opposite configuration with a rotating field and stationary armature. A bridge rectifier, called the rotating rectifier assembly, is mounted on the rotor. Neither brushes nor slip rings are used, which reduces the number of wearing parts. The main alternator has a rotating field and a stationary armature (power generation windings).

Varying the amount of current through the stationary exciter field coils varies the 3-phase output from the exciter. This output is rectified by a rotating rectifier assembly mounted on the rotor, and the resultant DC supplies the rotating field of the main alternator and hence alternator output. The result is that a small DC exciter current indirectly controls the output of the main alternator.

=== By number of phases ===
Another way to classify alternators is by the number of phases of their output voltage. The output can be single-phase or polyphase. Three-phase alternators are the most common, but polyphase alternators can be two-phase, six-phase, or more.

=== By rotating part ===
The revolving part of alternators can be the armature or the magnetic field. The revolving armature type has the armature wound on the rotor, where the winding moves through a stationary magnetic field. The revolving armature type is not often used. The revolving field type has a magnetic field on the rotor to rotate through a stationary armature winding. The advantage is that then the rotor circuit carries much less power than the armature circuit, making the slip ring connections smaller and less costly; only two contacts are needed for the direct-current rotor, whereas often a rotor winding has three phases, and multiple sections which would each require a slip-ring connection. The stationary armature can be wound for any convenient medium voltage level, up to tens of thousands of volts; manufacture of slip ring connections for more than a few thousand volts is costly and inconvenient.

=== Cooling methods ===
Many alternators are cooled by ambient air, forced through the enclosure by an attached fan on the shaft that drives the alternator. In vehicles such as transit buses, a heavy demand on the electrical system may require a large alternator to be oil-cooled. In marine applications water-cooling is also used. Expensive automobiles may use water-cooled alternators to meet high electrical system demands.

== Specific applications ==
=== Synchronous generators ===
Most power generation stations use synchronous machines as their generators. The connection of these generators to the utility grid requires synchronization conditions to be met. Synchronous generators provide several important system services. Their inherent rotational inertia slows the initial frequency decline after a sudden loss of generation, allowing turbine governors and other frequency-control reserves time to respond and restore balance. This role is increasingly significant as the share of non-synchronous generation, such as solar photovoltaics and many modern wind plants, grows in many power systems.

=== Automotive alternators ===
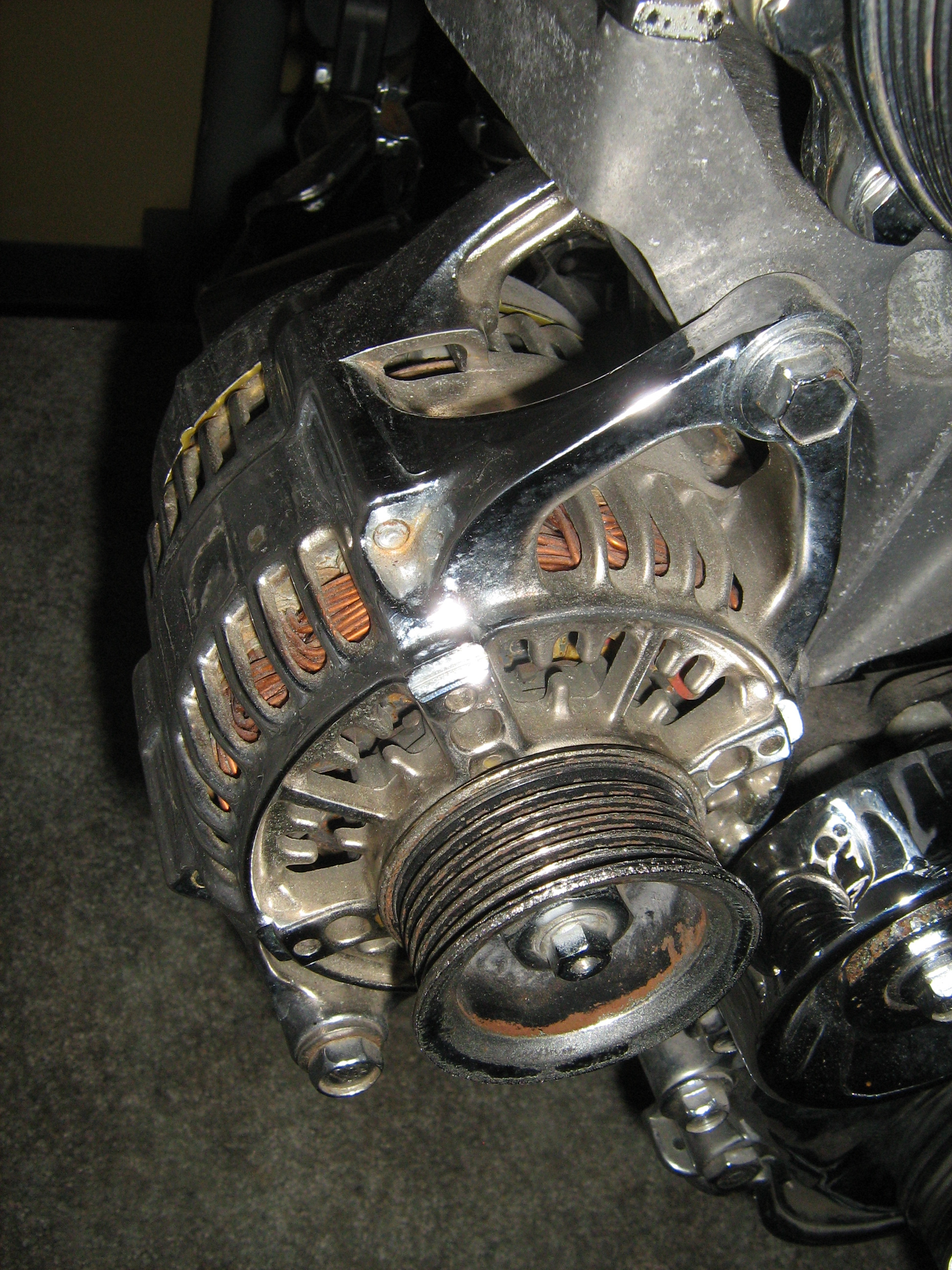
Alternator mounted on an automobile engine with a serpentine belt pulley (belt not present.)

Alternators are used in modern internal combustion engine automobiles to charge the battery and to power the electrical system when its engine is running. Until the 1960s, automobiles used DC dynamo generators with commutators. With the availability of affordable silicon-diode rectifiers, alternators came into common use.

=== Diesel–electric locomotive alternators ===
In later diesel–electric locomotives and diesel–electric multiple units, the prime mover turns an alternator which provides electricity for the traction motors (AC or DC). The traction alternator usually incorporates integral silicon diode rectifiers to provide the traction motors with up to 1,200 volts DC. The first diesel electric locomotives, and many of those still in service, use DC generators as, before silicon power electronics, it was easier to control the speed of DC traction motors. Most of these had two generators: one to generate the excitation current for a larger main generator. Optionally, the generator also supplies head-end power (HEP) or power for electric train heating. The HEP option requires a constant engine speed, typically 900 r/min for a 480 V 60 Hz HEP application, even when the locomotive is not moving.

=== Marine alternators ===
Marine alternators used in yachts are similar to automotive alternators, with appropriate adaptations to the salt-water environment. Marine alternators are designed to be explosion proof (ignition protected) so that brush sparking will not ignite explosive gas mixtures in an engine room environment. Depending on the type of system installed, they may be 12 or 24 volts. Larger marine diesels may have two or more alternators to cope with the heavy electrical demand of a modern yacht. On single alternator circuits, the power may be split between the engine starting battery and the domestic or house battery (or batteries) by use of a split-charge diode (battery isolator) or a voltage-sensitive relay. Due to the high cost of large house battery banks, Marine alternators generally use external regulators. Multistep regulators control the field current to maximize the charging effectiveness (time to charge) and battery life. Multistep regulators can be programmed for different battery types. Two temperature sensors can be added: one for the battery to adjust the charging voltage and an over-temperature sensor on the actual alternator to protect it from overheating.

=== Radio alternators ===
High-frequency alternators of the variable-reluctance type were applied commercially to radio transmission in low-frequency radio bands. These were used for transmitting Morse code and, experimentally, for transmitting voice and music. In the Alexanderson alternator, both the field winding and armature winding are stationary, and current is induced in the armature by the changing magnetic reluctance of the rotor (which has no windings or current-carrying parts). Such machines were made to produce radio frequency current for radio transmissions, although the efficiency was low.

== See also ==
- Bottle dynamo
- Dynamo
- Electric generator
- Engine-generator
- Flux switching alternator
- Folsom Powerhouse State Historic Park
- Hub dynamo
- Induction generator
- Jedlik's dynamo
- Linear alternator
- Magneto
- Polyphase coil
- Revolving armature alternator
- Single-phase generator
- Synchronverter
