= Paul Leonard Lewin =

Paul Leonard Lewin from the University of Southampton, in Southampton, Hampshire, UK was named Fellow of the Institute of Electrical and Electronics Engineers (IEEE) in 2013 for contributions to high voltage cable engineering.
