= Zemné =

Zemné Szímő
- Municipality
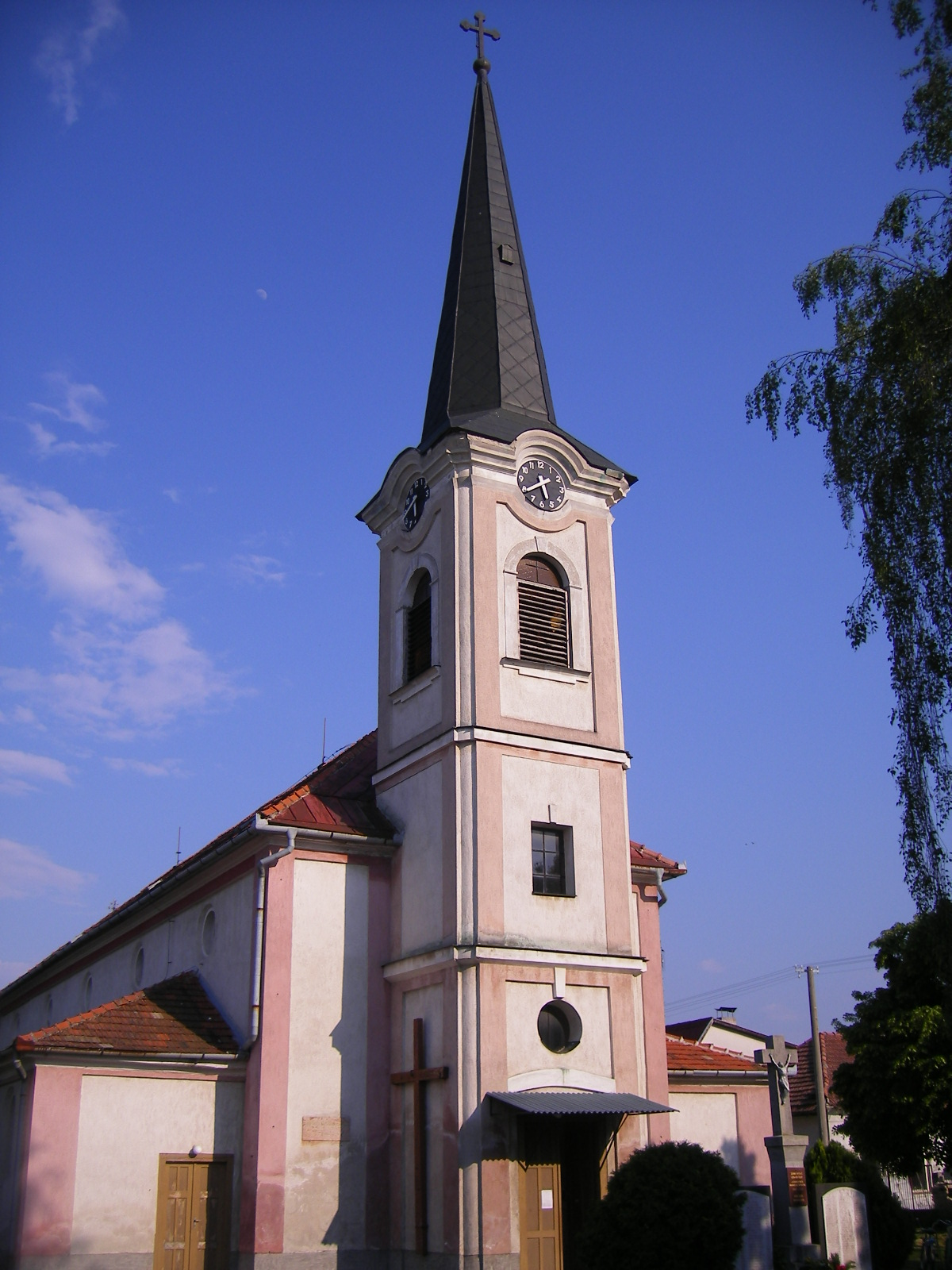
- Church of Saint Martin

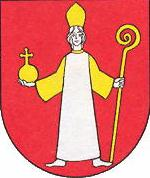
- Flag Coat of arms

- Location of Zemné in the Nitra Region Location of Zemné in Slovakia
- Coordinates: 47.98°N 18.00°E
- Country: Slovakia
- Region: Nitra Region
- District: Nové Zámky District
- First mentioned: 1113

Area
  - Total: 26.34 km^{2} (10.17 sq mi)
- Elevation: 112 m (367 ft)

Population (2025)
  - Total: 2,100
- Time zone: UTC+1 (CET)
  - Summer (DST): UTC+2 (CEST)
- Postal code: 941 22
- Area code: +421 35
- Vehicle registration plate (until 2022): NZ
- Website: www.zemne.sk

Zemné (Hungarian: Szímő) is a village and municipality in the Nové Zámky District in the Nitra Region of south-western Slovakia. The village is known as the birthplace of inventor Ányos Jedlik.

== History ==
In historical records the village was first mentioned in 1113.

== Geography ==
The municipality lies at an altitude of 112 metres (367 ft) and covers an area of 26.34 km^{2} (10.17 sq mi) (2025).

== Population ==
Population statistic (10 years)
Year	1995	2005	2015	2025
Count	2192	2223	2185	2100
Difference		+1.41%	−1.70%	−3.89%

Population statistic
Year	2024	2025
Count	2112	2100
Difference		−0.56%

It has a population of 2100 people (31 December 2025).

=== Ethnicity ===
Census 2021 (1+ %)
Ethnicity	Number	Fraction
Hungarian	1628	76.21%
Slovak	492	23.03%
Romani	327	15.3%
Not found out	140	6.55%
Total	2136	

In year 2021 was 2136 people by ethnicity 1628 as Hungarian, 492 as Slovak, 327 as Romani, 140 as Not found out, 8 as Czech, 3 as French, 2 as Italian, 2 as Rusyn, 2 as German, 1 as Other and 1 as Albanian.

Note on population: The difference values of population numbers in the table "Population statistic" and in the sections "Ethnicity" & "Religion" is caused by the use of various statistical methods.

=== Religion ===
Census 2021 (1+ %)
Religion	Number	Fraction
Roman Catholic Church	1490	69.76%
None	457	21.4%
Not found out	86	4.03%
Evangelical Church	31	1.45%
Calvinist Church	26	1.22%
Total	2136	

In year 2021 was 2136 people by religion 1490 from Roman Catholic Church, 457 from None, 86 from Not found out, 31 from Evangelical Church, 26 from Calvinist Church, 9 from Christian Congregations in Slovakia, 9 from Greek Catholic Church, 6 from Other and not ascertained christian church, 6 from Jehovah's Witnesses, 4 from Old Catholic Church, 4 from United Methodist Church, 4 from Buddhism, 2 from Apostolic Church, 1 from Other and 1 from Ad hoc movements.

== People ==
- Ányos Jedlik, the Hungarian inventor born in Zemné in 1800.

== Facilities ==
The village has a small public library and football pitch.
