= Electrical isolation test =

Test to ensure electrical sub-systems have a specified level of resistance

In electrical engineering, an electrical isolation test is a direct current (DC) or alternating current (AC) resistance test that is performed on sub-systems of an electronic system to verify that a specified level of isolation resistance is met. Isolation testing may also be conducted between one or more electrical circuits of the same subsystem. The test often reveals problems that occurred during assembly, such as defective components, improper component placement, and insulator defects that may cause inadvertent shorting or grounding to chassis, in turn, compromising electrical circuit quality and product safety.

Isolation resistance measurements may be achieved using a high input impedance ohmmeter, digital multimeter (DMM) or current-limited Hipot test instrument. The selected equipment should not over-stress sensitive electronic components comprising the subsystem. The test limits should also consider semiconductor components within the subsystem that may be activated by the potentials imposed by each type of test instrumentation. A minimum acceptable resistance value is usually specified (typically in the mega ohm (MΩ) range per circuit tested). Multiple circuits having a common return may be tested simultaneously, provided the minimum allowable resistance value is based on the number of circuits in parallel.

Five basic isolation test configurations exist:

1. Single Un-referenced End-Circuit – isolation between one input signal and circuit chassis/common ground.
2. Multiple Un-referenced End-Circuits with a single return – isolation between several input signals and circuit chassis/common ground.
3. Subsystem with Isolated Common – isolation between signal input and common ground.
4. Common Chassis Ground – isolation between circuit common and chassis (chassis grounded).
5. Isolated Circuit Common – isolation between circuit common and chassis (chassis floating).

Isolation measurements are made with the assembly or subsystem unpowered and disconnected from any support equipment.

== See also ==
- Dielectric withstand test
- Electrical breakdown
- Galvanic isolation
