= Dissipation factor =

Measure of loss-rate of energy of a mode of oscillation in a dissipative system

In physics, the dissipation factor (DF) is a measure of the loss rate of energy of a mode of oscillation (mechanical, electrical, or electromechanical) in a dissipative system. It is the reciprocal of quality factor, which represents the quality or durability of oscillation.

== Explanation ==
Electrical potential energy is dissipated in all dielectric materials, usually in the form of heat. In a capacitor made of a dielectric placed between conductors, the typical lumped element model includes a lossless ideal capacitor in series with a resistor termed the equivalent series resistance (ESR) as shown below. The ESR represents losses in the capacitor. In a good capacitor the ESR is very small, and in a poor capacitor the ESR is large. However, ESR is sometimes a minimum value to be required. Note that the ESR is not simply the resistance that would be measured across a capacitor by an ohmmeter. The ESR is a derived quantity with physical origins in both the dielectric's conduction electrons and dipole relaxation phenomena. In dielectric only one of either the conduction electrons or the dipole relaxation typically dominates loss. For the case of the conduction electrons being the dominant loss, then

$$\text{ESR} = \frac{\sigma}{\varepsilon \omega^2 C}$$

where

- $\sigma$ is the dielectric's bulk conductivity,
- $\varepsilon$ is the lossless permittivity of the dielectric, and
- $\omega = 2\pi f$ is the angular frequency of the AC current i,
- $C$ is the lossless capacitance.

A real capacitor has a lumped element model of a lossless ideal capacitor in series with an equivalent series resistance (ESR). The loss tangent is defined by the angle between the capacitor's impedance vector and the negative reactive axis.

If the capacitor is used in an AC circuit, the dissipation factor due to the non-ideal capacitor is expressed as the ratio of the resistive power loss in the ESR to the reactive power oscillating in the capacitor, or

$$\text{DF} = \frac{i^2 \text{ESR}}{i^2 \left|X_c\right|} = \omega C\, \text{ESR} = \frac{\sigma}{\varepsilon\omega} = \frac{1}{Q}$$

When representing the electrical circuit parameters as vectors in a complex plane, known as phasors, a capacitor's dissipation factor is equal to the tangent of the angle between the capacitor's impedance vector and the negative reactive axis, as shown in the adjacent diagram. This gives rise to the parameter known as the loss tangent tan δ where

$$\frac{1}{Q} = \tan(\delta) = \frac{\text{ESR}}{\left|X_c\right|} = \text{DF}$$

Alternatively, $\text{ESR}$ can be derived from frequency at which loss tangent was determined and capacitance

$$\text{ESR} = \frac{1}{\omega C}\tan(\delta)$$

Since the $\text{DF}$ in a good capacitor is usually small, $\delta \sim \text{DF}$, and $\text{DF}$ is often expressed as a percentage.

$\text{DF}$ approximates to the power factor when $\text{ESR}$ is far less than $X_c$, which is usually the case.

$\text{DF}$ will vary depending on the dielectric material and the frequency of the electrical signals. In low dielectric constant (low-κ), temperature compensating ceramics, $\text{DF}$ of 0.1–0.2% is typical. In high dielectric constant ceramics, $\text{DF}$ can be 1–2%. However, lower $\text{DF}$ is usually an indication of quality capacitors when comparing similar dielectric material.

== See also ==
- Dielectric withstand test
- Impulse generator
