= High-voltage cable =

Cable used for electric power transmission at high voltage

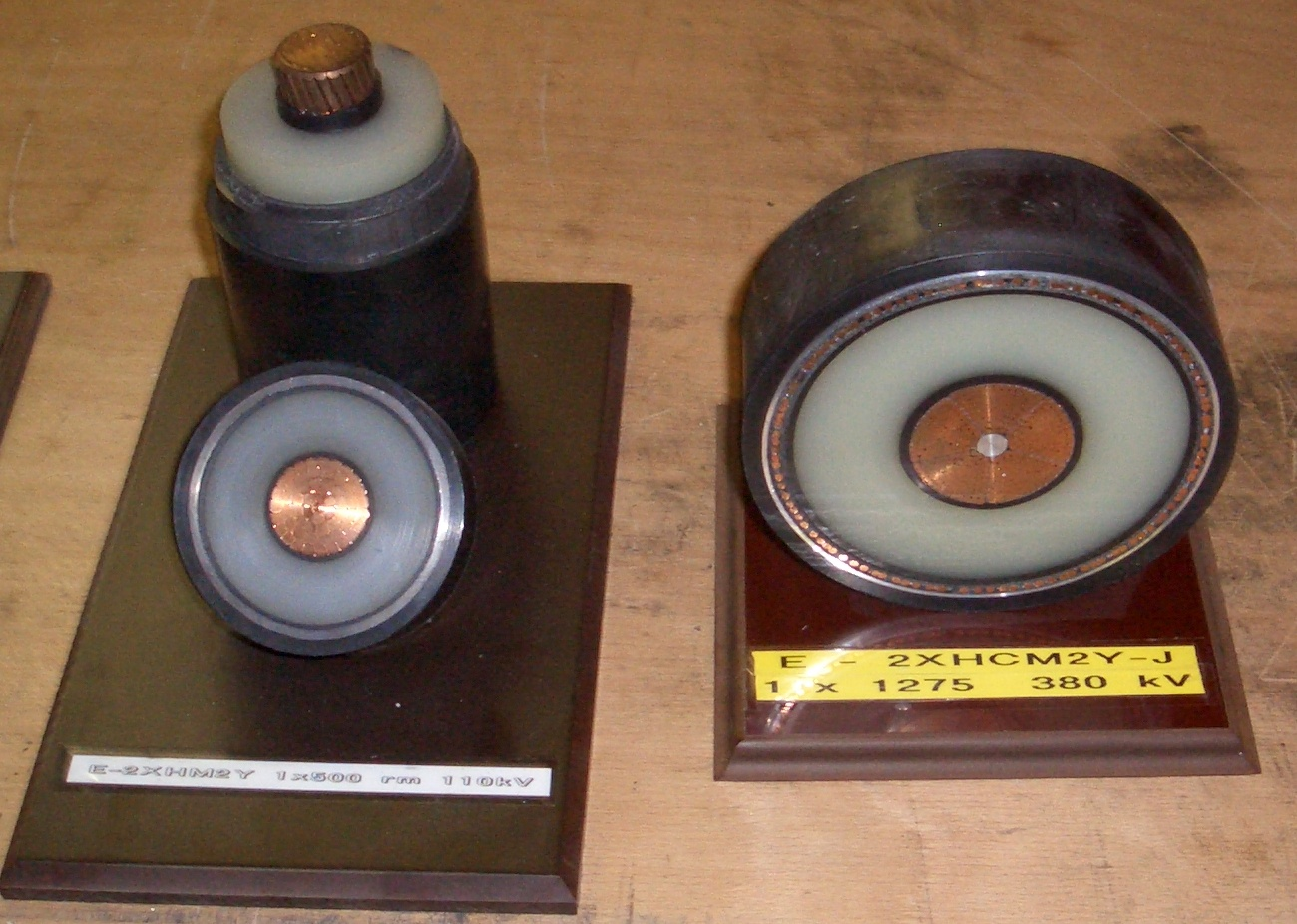
Figure 1: Segments of high-voltage XLPE cables

A high-voltage cable (HV cable), sometimes called a high-tension cable (HT cable), is a cable used for electric power transmission at high voltage. A cable includes a conductor and insulation. Cables are considered to be fully insulated. This means that they have a fully rated insulation system that will consist of insulation, semi-con layers, and a metallic shield. This is in contrast to an overhead line, which may include insulation but not fully rated for operating voltage (EG: tree wire). High-voltage cables of differing types have a variety of applications in instruments, ignition systems, and alternating current (AC) and direct current (DC) power transmission. In all applications, the insulation of the cable must not deteriorate due to the high-voltage stress, ozone produced by electric discharges in air, or tracking. The cable system must prevent contact of the high-voltage conductor with other objects or persons, and must contain and control leakage current. Cable joints and terminals must be designed to control the high-voltage stress to prevent the breakdown of the insulation.

The cut lengths of high-voltage cables may vary from several feet to thousands of feet, with relatively short cables used in apparatus and longer cables run within buildings or as buried cables in an industrial plant or for power distribution. The longest cut lengths of cable will often be submarine cables under the ocean for power transmission.

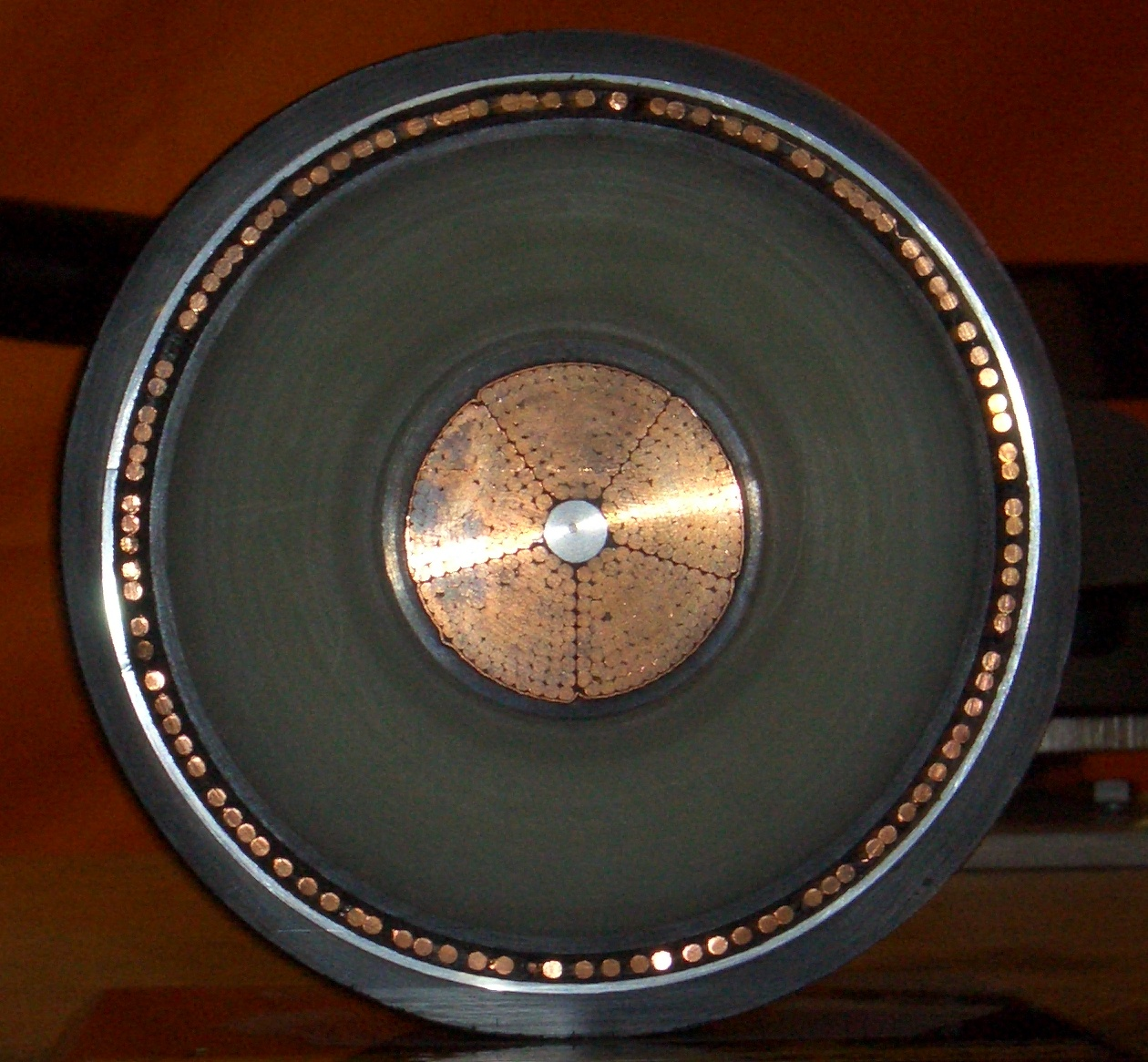
Figure 2: A cross-section through a 400 kV cable, showing the stranded segmented copper conductor in the center, semiconducting and insulating layers, copper shield conductors, aluminum sheath, and plastic outer jacket.

== Cable insulation technologies ==
Like other power cables, high-voltage cables have the structural elements of one or more conductors, an insulation system, and a protective jacket. High-voltage cables differ from lower-voltage cables in that they have additional internal layers in the insulation system to control the electric field around the conductor. These additional layers are required at 2,000 V and above between conductors. Without these semi-conducting layers, the cable will fail due to electrical stress within minutes. This technique was patented by Martin Hochstadter in 1916; the shield is sometimes called a Hochstadter shield and shielded cable used to be called H-Type Cable. Depending on the grounding scheme, the shields of a cable can be connected to the ground at one end or both ends of the cable. Splices in the middle of the cable can also be grounded depending on the length of the circuit and if a semiconducting jacket is employed on direct buried circuits.

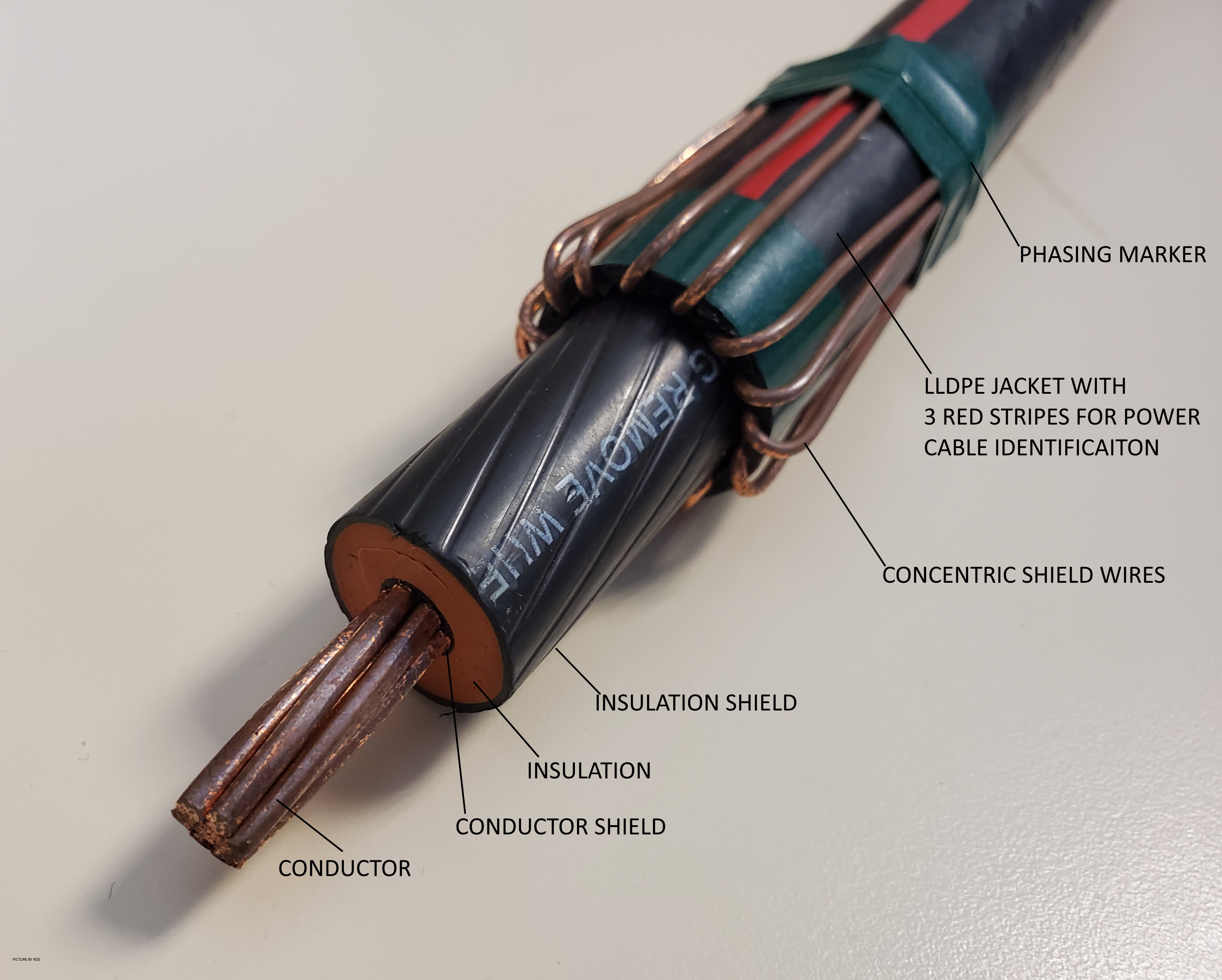
Figure 3, Cross-section of typical 15 kV #2 copper medium-voltage EPR cable. Suitable for URD installation, direct buried, or in a duct. All layers of the cable construction are marked and identified.

Since 1960 solid dielectric extruded cables have taken dominance in the distribution market. These medium voltage cables are generally insulated with EPR or XLPE polymeric insulation. EPR insulation is common on cables from 4 to 34 kV. EPR is not commonly used over 35 kV due to losses, however, it can be found in 69 kV cables. XLPE is used at all voltage levels from the 600V class and up. Sometimes EAM insulation is marketed, however, market penetration remains fairly low. Solid, extruded insulation cables such as EPR and XLPE account for the majority of distribution and transmission cables produced today. However, the relative unreliability of early XLPE resulted in a slow adoption at transmission voltages. Cables of 330, 400, and 500 kV are commonly constructed using XLPE today, but this has occurred only in recent decades.

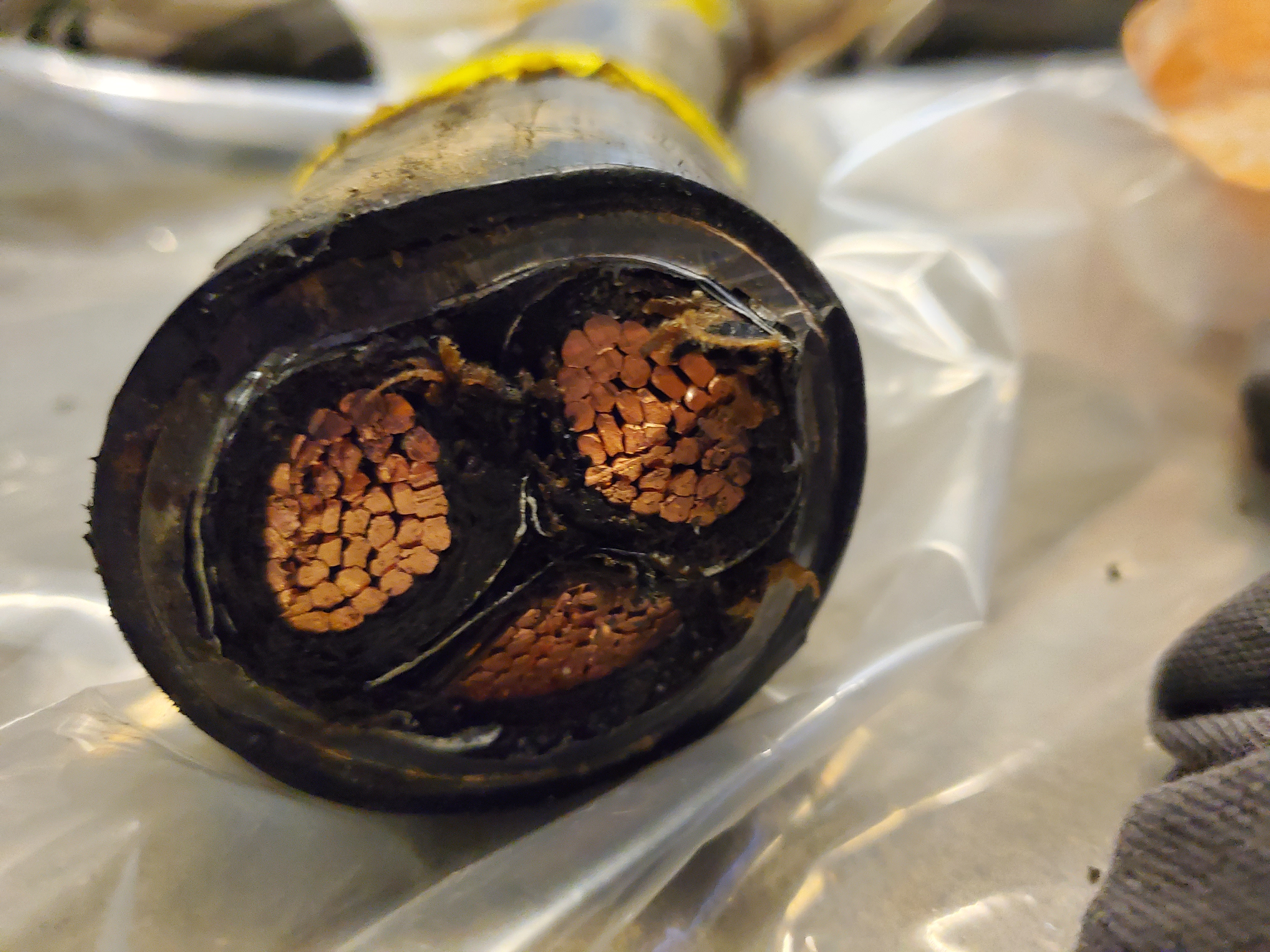
Figure 4: Typical 15 kV insulation class three-conductor (3/C) paper-insulated lead-covered (PILC) cable. 1990s vintage.

An increasingly uncommon insulation type is PILC or paper insulation lead-covered cable. Some utilities still install this for distribution circuits as new construction or replacement. Sebastian Ziani de Ferranti was the first to demonstrate in 1887 that carefully dried and prepared kraft paper could form satisfactory cable insulation at 11,000 V. Previously paper-insulated cable had only been applied for low-voltage telegraph and telephone circuits. An extruded lead sheath over the paper cable was required to ensure that the paper remained moisture-free. Mass-impregnated paper-insulated medium voltage cables were commercially practical by 1895. During World War II several varieties of synthetic rubber and polyethylene insulation were applied to cables. Modern high-voltage cables use polymers, especially polyethylene, including cross-linked polyethylene (XLPE) for insulation.

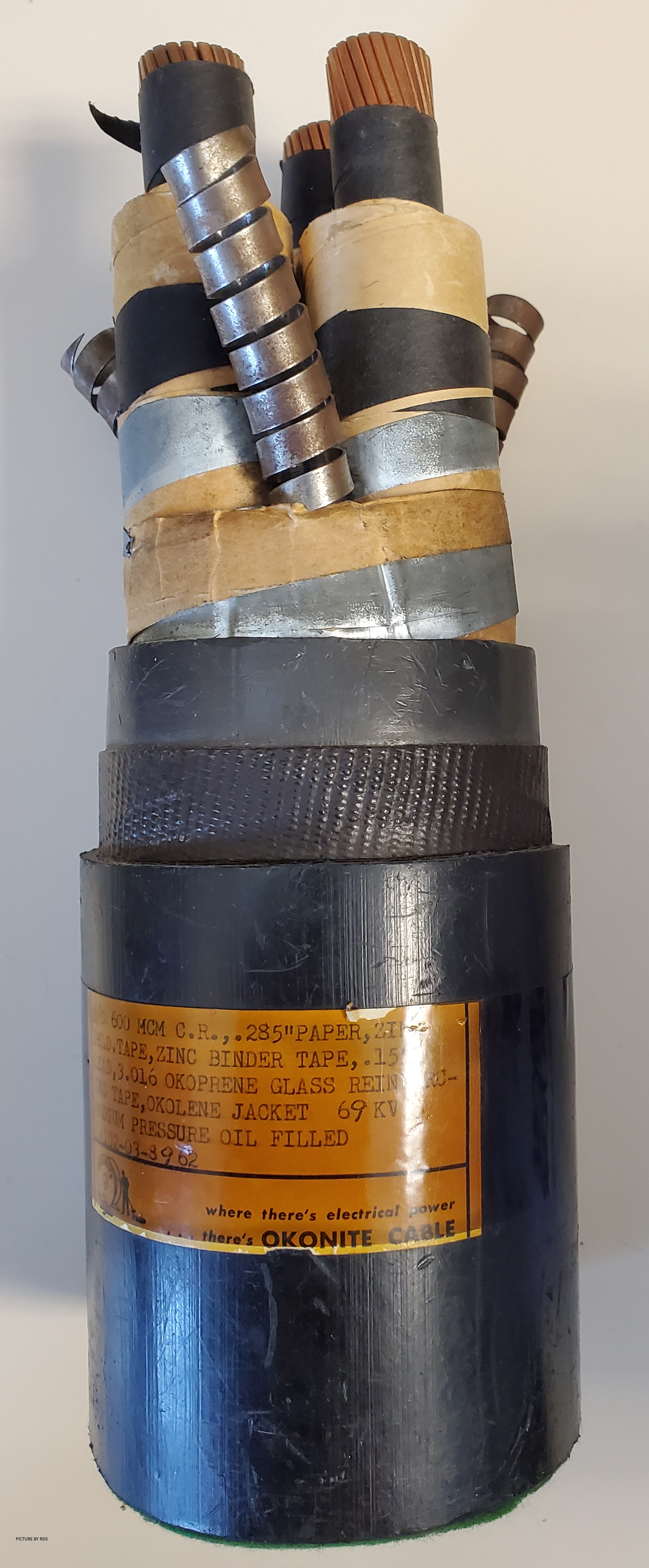
Figure 5: 69 kV Medium Pressure Oil Filled Cable. This cable features concentric copper conductors insulated in kraft paper. Shield on the individual phases is provided with interlaced carbon and zinc tapes. The overall shield is also provided. Tubes facilitate oil movement provided by a series of pumping plants. 150 mils of lead provide protection from moisture.

The demise of PILC could be considered to be in the 1980s and 1990s as urban utilities started to install more EPR and XLPE insulated cables. The factors for the decreased use of PILC are the high level of craftsmanship needed to splice lead, longer splicing times, reduced availability of the product domestically, and pressure to stop using lead for environmental and safety reasons. It should also be noted that rubber insulated lead-covered cable enjoyed a short period of popularity prior to 1960 in the low and medium voltage markets but was not widely used by most utilities. Existing PILC feeders are often considered to be near the end of life by most utilities and subject to replacement programs.

Vulcanized rubber was patented by Charles Goodyear in 1844, but it was not applied to cable insulation until the 1880s when it was used for lighting circuits. Rubber-insulated cable was used for 11,000 V circuits in 1897 installed for the Niagara Falls Power Generation project.

Oil-filled, gas-filled, and pipe-type cables have been largely considered obsolete since the 1960s. Such cables are designed to have significant oil flow through the cable. Standard PILC cables are impregnated with oil but the oil is not designed to flow or cool the cable. Oil-filled cables are typically lead-insulated and can be purchased on reels. Pipe-type cables differ from oil-filled cables in that they are installed in a rigid pipe usually made of steel. With pipe-type cables, the pipes are constructed first, and then at a later date, the cable is pulled through. The cable may feature skid wires to prevent damage during the pulling process. The cross-sectional volume of oil in a pipe-type cable is significantly higher than in an oil-filled cable. These pipe-type cables are oil-filled at nominal low, medium, and high pressures. Higher voltages require higher oil pressures to prevent the formation of voids that would allow partial discharges within the cable insulation. Pipe-type cables will typically have a cathodic protection system driven off voltage where an oil-filled cable circuit would not. Pipe-type cable systems are often protected from forming holidays through an asphaltic coating. There are still many of these pipe-type circuits in operation today. However, they have fallen out of favor due to the high front-end cost and massive O+M budget needed to maintain the fleet of pumping plants.

== Cable insulation components ==
High voltage is defined as any voltage over 1000 volts. Those of 2 to 33 kV are usually called medium voltage cables, those over 50 kV high voltage cables.

Modern HV cables have a simple design consisting of a few parts: the conductor, the conductor shield, the insulation, the insulation shield, the metallic shield, and the jacket. Other layers can include water blocking tapes, ripcords, and armor wires. Copper or aluminum wires transports the current, see (1) in figure 1. (For a detailed discussion on copper cables, see main article: Copper conductor.) The insulation, insulation shield, and conductor shield are generally polymer-based with a few rare exceptions.

Single conductor designs under 2000 KCM are generally concentric. The individual strands are often deformed during the stranding process to provide a smoother overall circumference. These are known as compact and compressed conductors. Compact offers a 10% reduction in conductor outer diameter while the compressed version only offers a 3% decrease. The selection of a compressed or compact conductor will often require a different connector during splicing. 2000 KCM and larger transmission cables often include a sectored style design to reduce skin effect losses. Utility power cables are often designed to run at up to 75°C, 90°C, and 105°C conductor temperatures. This temperature is limited by the construction standard and jacket selection.

The conductor shield is always permanently bonded to the EPR or XLPE cable insulation in the solid dielectric cable. The semi-conductive insulation shield can be bonded or removable depending on the desires of the purchaser. For voltages 69KV and up the insulation shield is generally bonded. A strippable insulation shield is purchased to reduce splicing time and skill. It can be argued that strippable Semicon can lead to fewer workmanship issues at medium voltage. With paper insulated cables the semiconducting layers consist of carbon-bearing or metalized tapes applied over the conductor and paper insulation. The function of these layers is to prevent air-filled cavities and suppress voltage stress between the metal conductors and the dielectric so that little electric discharges cannot arise and endanger the insulation material.

The insulation shield is covered by a copper, aluminum, or lead "screen." The metallic shield or sheath serves as an earthed layer and will drain leakage currents. The shield's function is not to conduct faults but that functionality can be designed if desired. Some designs that could be used are copper tape, concentric copper wires, longitudinally corrugated shields, copper flat straps, or extruded lead sheath.

The cable jacket is often polymeric. The function of the jacket is to provide mechanical protection as well as prevent moisture & chemical intrusion. Jackets can be semiconducting or non-conducting depending on soil conditions and desired grounding configuration. Semiconducting jackets can also be employed on cables to help with a jacket integrity test. Some types of jackets are LLDPE, HDPE, polypropylene, PVC (bottom end of the market), LSZH, etc.

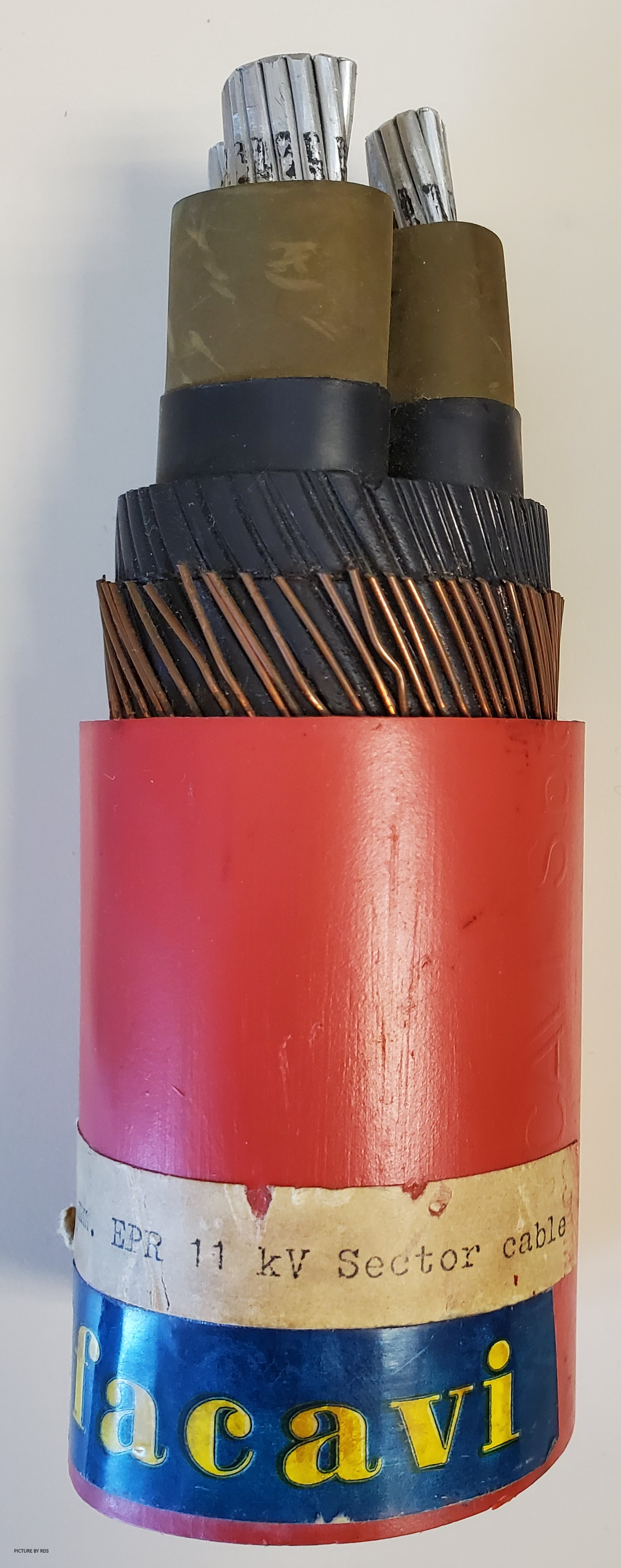
Figure 6: An example of 15KV class 3 conductor (3/C) solid extruded insulation (EPR) cable. This cable construction features sectored aluminum conductors rather than concentric in an effort to reduce the overall diameter of the cable.

== Quality ==
During the development of high voltage insulation, which has taken about half a century, two characteristics proved to be paramount. First, the introduction of the semiconducting layers. These layers must be absolutely smooth, without even protrusions as small as a few μm. Further, the fusion between the insulation and these layers must be absolute; any fission, air-pocket or other defect — again, even of a few μm — is detrimental to the cable. Second, the insulation must be free of inclusions, cavities, or other defects of the same sort of size. Any defect of these types shortens the voltage life of the cable which is supposed to be in the order of 30 years or more.

Cooperation between cable makers and manufacturers of materials has resulted in grades of XLPE with tight specifications. Most producers of XLPE-compound specify an "extra clean" grade where the number and size of foreign particles are guaranteed. Packing the raw material and unloading it within a cleanroom environment in the cable-making machines is required. The development of extruders for plastics extrusion and cross-linking has resulted in cable-making installations for making defect-free and pure insulations. The final quality control test is an elevated voltage 50 or 60 Hz partial discharge test with very high sensitivity (in the range of 5 to 10 picocoulombs) This test is performed on every reel of cable before it is shipped.

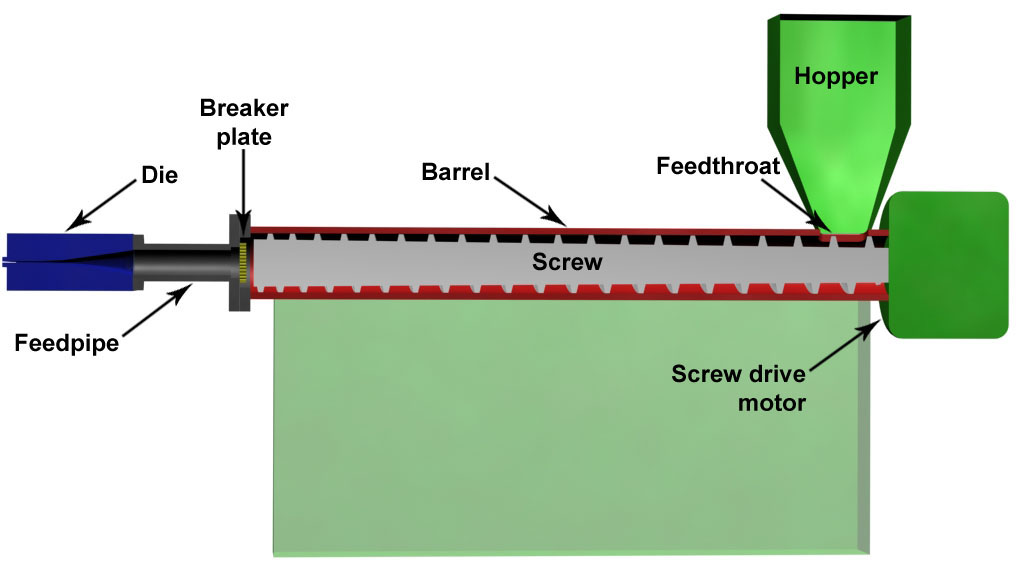
Figure 7: An extruder machine for making insulated cable

== HVDC cable ==
A high-voltage cable for high-voltage direct current (HVDC) transmission has the same construction as the AC cable shown in figure 1. The physics and the test requirements are different. In this case the smoothness of the semiconducting layers (2) and (4) is of utmost importance. Cleanliness of the insulation remains imperative. The semiconducting material can be plastic XLPE (cross-linked polyethylene) with carbon black.

Many HVDC cables are used for DC submarine connections, because at distances over approximately 100 km AC can no longer be used. As of 2021 the longest submarine cable is the North Sea Link cable between Norway and the UK which is 720 km (450 mi) long.

== Cable terminals ==
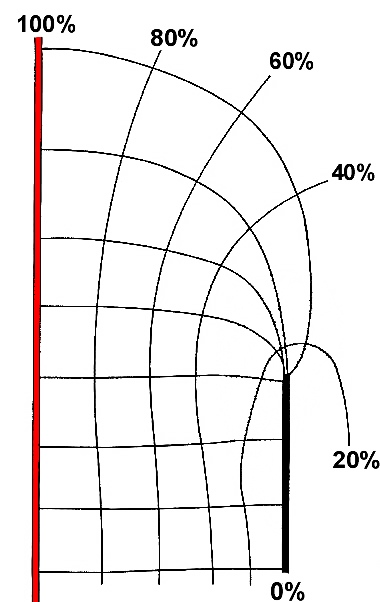
Figure 8, the earth shield of a cable (0%) is cut off, the equipotential lines (from 20% to 80%) concentrate at the edge of the earth electrode, causing danger of breakdown.

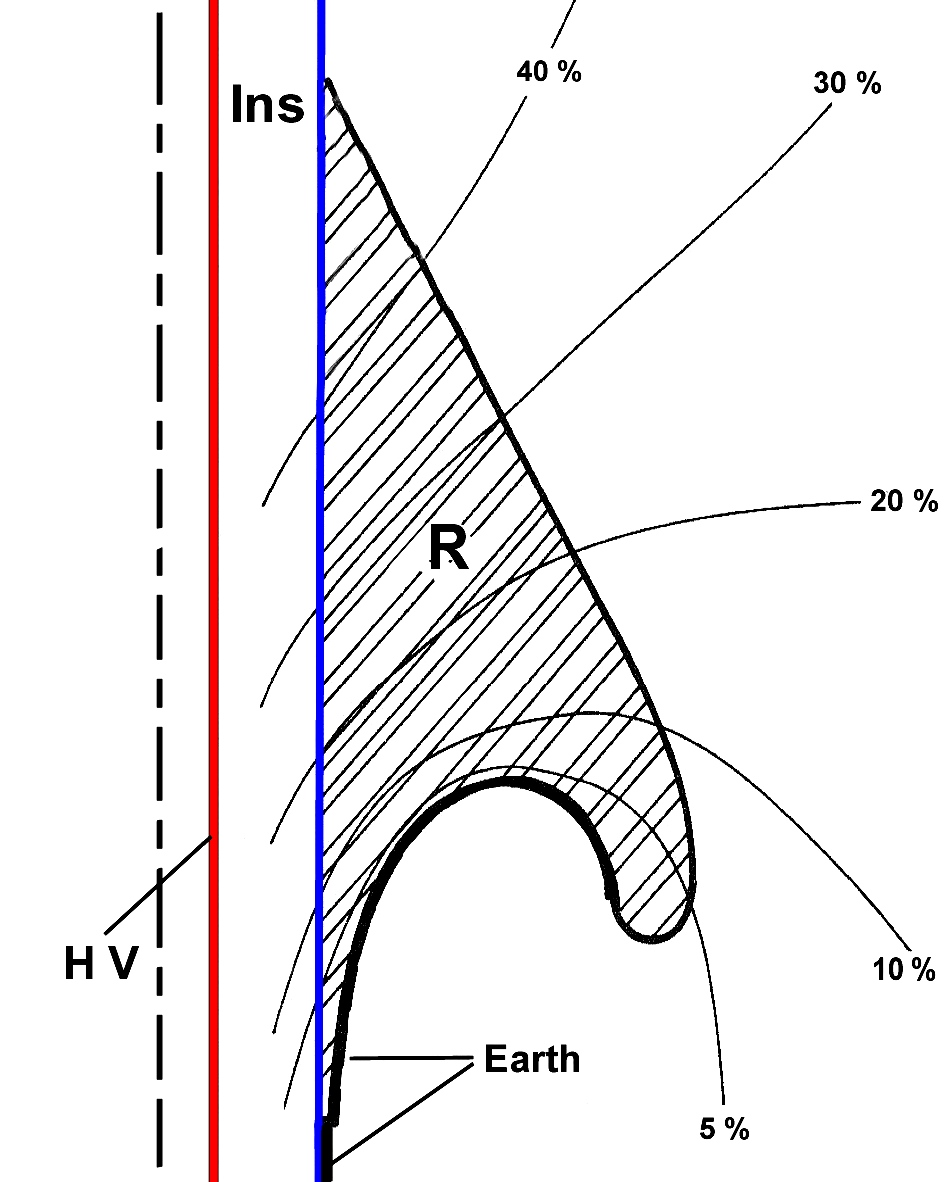
Figure 9: A rubber or elastomer body R is pushed over the insulation (blue) of the cable. The equipotential lines between HV (high voltage) and earth are evenly spread out by the shape of the earth electrode. Field concentrations are presented in this way.

Terminals of high-voltage cables must manage the electric fields at the ends. Without such a construction the electric field will concentrate at the end of the earth-conductor as shown in figure 8.

Equipotential lines are shown here, which can be compared with the contour lines on a map of a mountainous region: the nearer these lines are to each other, the steeper the slope and the greater the danger, in this case, the danger of an electrical breakdown. The equipotential lines can also be compared with the isobars on a weather map: The denser the lines, the more wind and the greater the danger of damage. In order to control the equipotential lines (that is to control the electric field) a device is used that is called a stress cone, see figure 9. The crux of stress relief is to flare the shield end along a logarithmic curve. Before 1960, the stress cones were handmade using tape—after the cable was installed. These were protected by potheads, so named because a potting compound/dielectric was poured around the tape inside a metal/ porcelain body insulator. About 1960, preformed terminations were developed consisting of a rubber or elastomer body that is stretched over the cable end. On this rubber-like body R a shield electrode is applied that spreads the equipotential lines to guarantee a low electric field.

The crux of this device, invented by NKF in Delft in 1964, is that the bore of the elastic body is narrower than the diameter of the cable. In this way the (blue) interface between cable and stress-cone is brought under mechanical pressure so that no cavities or air pockets can be formed between cable and cone. Electric breakdown in this region is prevented in this way.

This construction can further be surrounded by a porcelain or silicone insulator for outdoor use, or by contraptions to enter the cable into a power transformer under oil, or switchgear under gas pressure.

== Cable joints ==
Connecting two high-voltage cables with one another poses two main problems. First, the outer conducting layers in both cables must be terminated without causing a field concentration, as with the making of a cable terminal. Secondly, a field-free space must be created where the cut-down cable insulation and the connector of the two conductors safely can be accommodated. These problems were solved by NKF in Delft in 1965 by introducing a device called bi-manchet cuff.

Figure 10 shows a photograph of the cross-section of such a device. At one side of this photograph, the contours of a high-voltage cable are drawn. Here red represents the conductor of that cable and blue the insulation of the cable. The black parts in this picture are semiconducting rubber parts. The outer one is at earth potential and spreads the electric field in a similar way as in a cable terminal. The inner one is at high voltage and shields the connector of the conductors from the electric field.

The field itself is diverted as shown in figure 11, where the equipotential lines are smoothly directed from the inside of the cable to the outer part of the bi-manchet (and vice versa at the other side of the device).

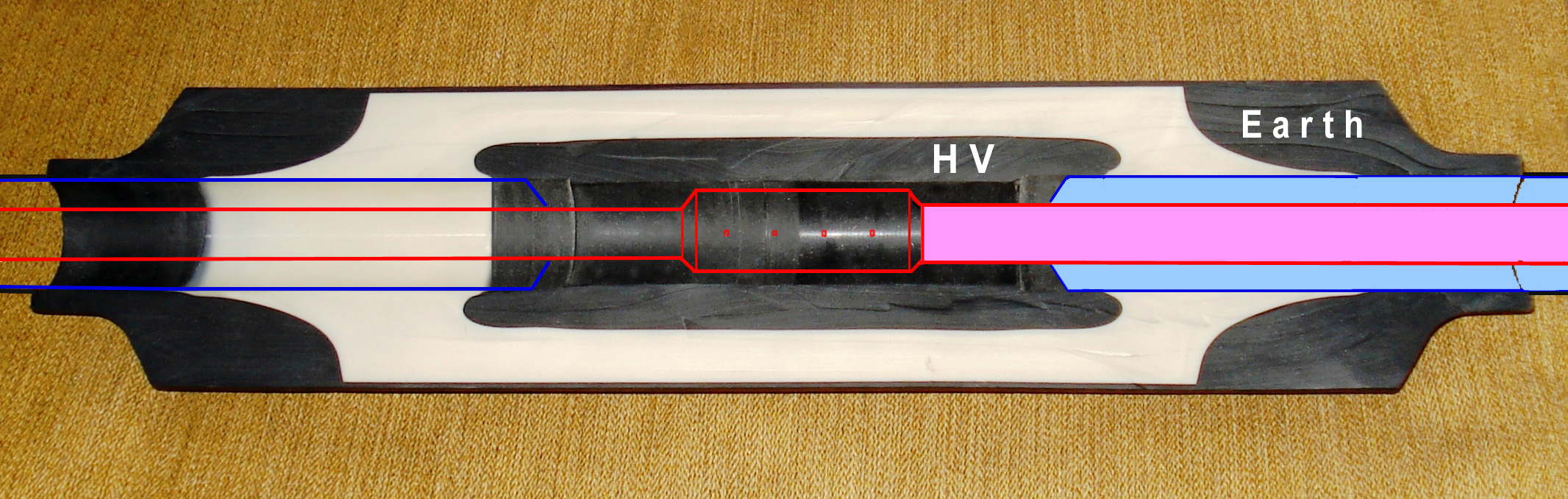
Figure 10: Photograph of a section of a high-voltage joint, bi-manchet, with a high-voltage cable mounted at the right-hand side of the device

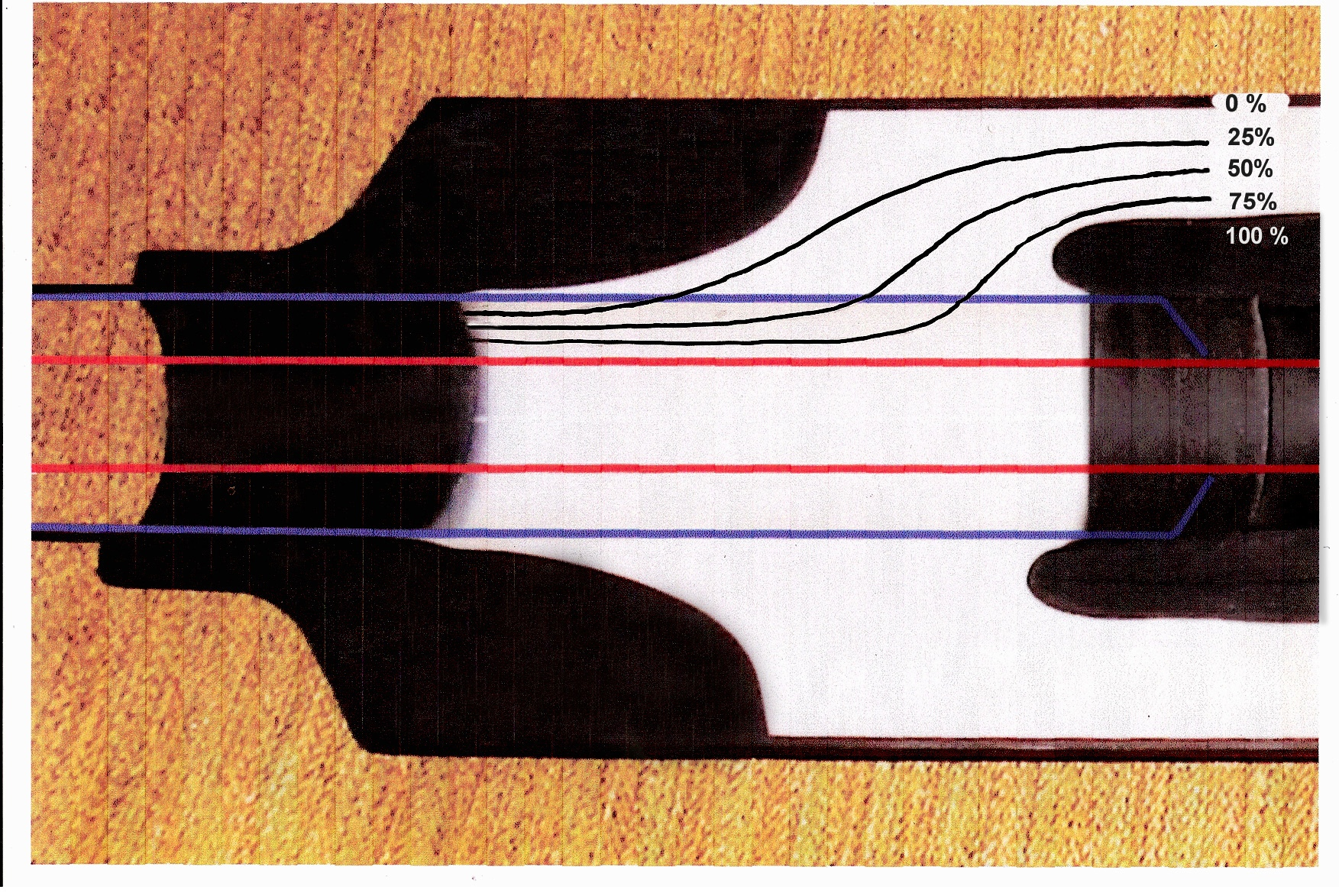
Figure 11: Field distribution in a bi-manchet, or HV, joint

The crux of the matter is here, like in the cable terminal, that the inner bore of this bi-manchet is chosen smaller than the diameter over the cable insulation. In this way a permanent pressure is created between the bi-manchet and the cable surface, and cavities or electrical weak points are avoided.

Installing a terminal or bi-manchet cuff is skilled work. The technical steps of removing the outer semiconducting layer at the end of the cables, placing the field-controlling bodies, connecting the conductors, etc., require skill, cleanliness, and precision.

=== Hand-taped joints ===
Hand taped joints are the old-school method of splicing and terminating cable. The construction of these joints involves taking several types of tape and manually building up appropriate stress relief. Some of the tapes involved could be rubber tapes, semiconducting tapes, friction tapes, varnished cambric tapes, etc. This splicing method is incredibly labor and time-intensive. It requires measuring the diameter and length of the layers being built up. Often the tapes must be half-lapped and pulled tight to prevent the formation of windows or voids in the resulting splice. Waterproofing hand taped splicing is very difficult.

=== Pre-molded joints ===
Pre-molded joints are injection molded bodies created in two or more stages. Due to automation, the Faraday cage will have a precise geometry and placement not achievable in taped joints. Pre-molded joints come in many different body sizes that much be matched up to the cable Semicon's outside diameter. A tight joint interface is required to ensure waterproofing. These joints are often pushed on and can cause soft tissue injuries among craftsmen.

=== Heat shrink joints ===
Heat shrink joints consist of many different heat shrink tubes: insulating and conducting. These kits are less labor-intensive than taping but more than pre-molded. There can be concerns about having an open flame in a manhole or building vault. There can also be workmanship concerns with using a torch as the tubes must be fully recovered without scorching and any mastics used must flow into the voids and eliminate any air. Sufficient time and heat must be given. There are also a high number of components that must be placed in the correct order and position relative to the center of the joint. Most of the construction sites prefer this type of joints for its low cost.

=== Cold shrink joints ===
Cold shrink is the newest family of joints. The idea is a polymer tube is formed at the correct diameter for the cable. It is then expanded over a form and placed onto a hold-out tube at the factory. Then ready for installation the joint is very easily slipped over the cable end. After the connector is installed the splicer simply needs to center the joint body and then release the holdout. The tube will automatically recover to the original size. The only complication is cold shrink has a shelf life of approximately 2–3 years. After that time period, the rubber will form memory and not recover down to the intended size. This can lead to joint failure if not installed before the recommended date. From a utility perspective, this makes it difficult to keep track of stock or retain emergency spares for critical customers. Cold shrink is the more rapidly growing area of distribution splices and is thought to have the fewest workmanship issues with the quickest install times.

== X-ray cable ==
X-ray cables are used in lengths of several meters to connect the HV source with an X-ray tube or any other HV device in scientific equipment. They transmit small currents, in the order of milliamperes at DC voltages of 30 to 200 kV, or sometimes higher. The cables are flexible, with rubber or other elastomer insulation, stranded conductors, and an outer sheath of braided copper wire. The construction has the same elements as other HV power cables.

== Testing of high-voltage cables ==
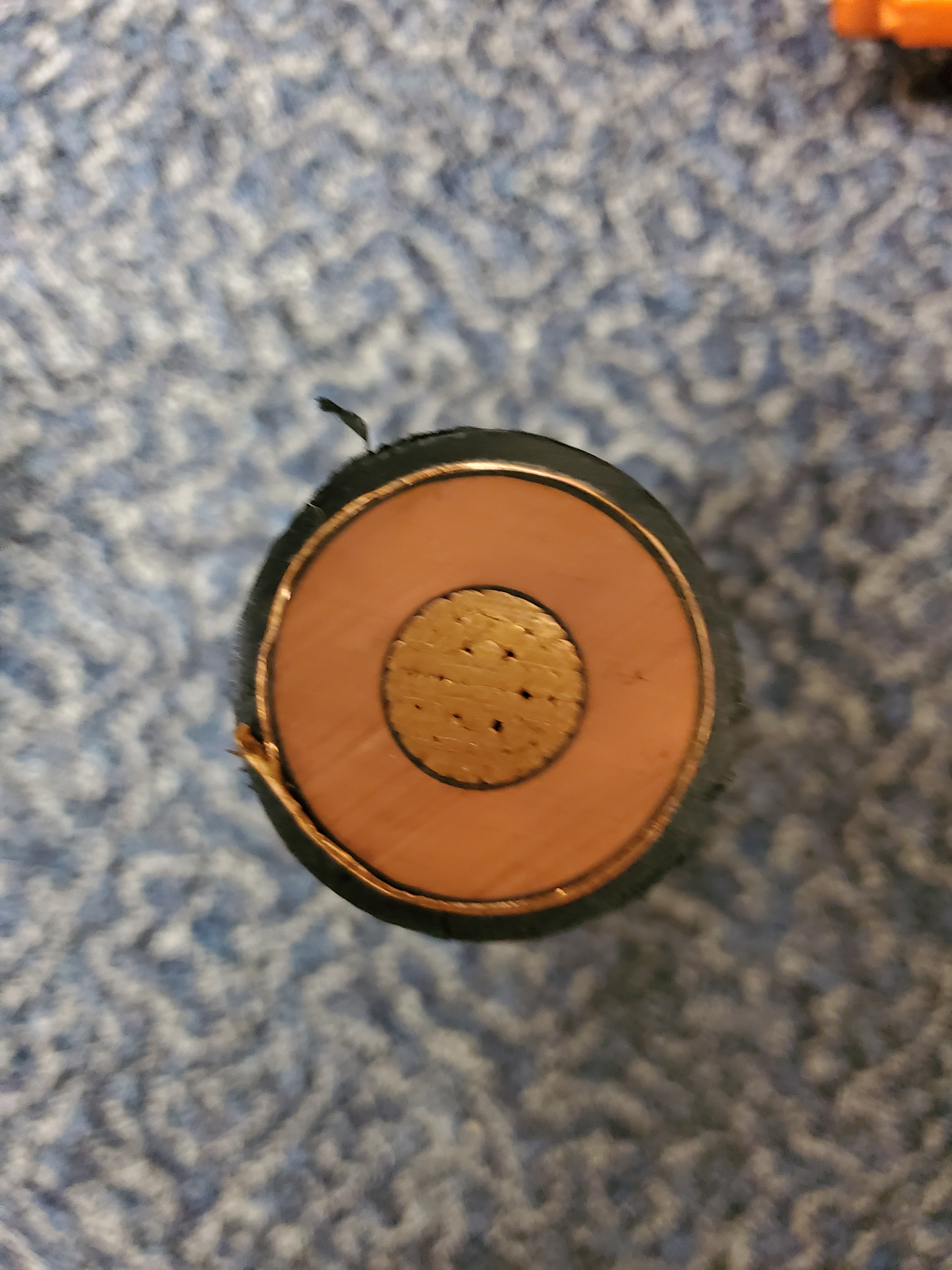
This is a 15KV insulation class cable shielded with a 5 mil copper tape.

There are different causes for faulty cable insulation when considering solid dielectric or paper insulation. Hence, there are various test and measurement methods to prove fully functional cables or to detect faulty ones. While paper cables are primarily tested with DC insulation resistance tests the most common test for solid dielectric cable systems is the partial discharge test. One needs to distinguish between cable testing and cable diagnosis.

While cable testing methods result in a go/no go statement cable diagnosis methods allow judgment of the cable's current condition. With some tests, it is even possible to locate the position of the defect in the insulation before failure.

In some cases, electrical treeing (water trees) can be detected by tan delta measurement. Interpretation of measurement results can in some cases yield the possibility to distinguish between new, strongly water treed cable. Unfortunately, there are many other issues that can erroneously present themselves as high tangent delta, and the vast majority of solid dielectric defects can not be detected with this method. Damage to the insulation and electrical treeing may be detected and located by partial discharge measurement. Data collected during the measurement procedure are compared to measurement values of the same cable gathered during the acceptance test. This allows a simple and quick classification of the dielectric condition of the tested cable. Just like with tangent delta, this method has many caveats, but with good adherence to factory test standards, field results can be very reliable.

== See also ==
- Dielectric absorption, a hazard
- Electric power transmission
- High-voltage direct current
- Power cable
- VLF cable testing
