= VLF cable testing =

Operational Continuity Assurance Practice

VLF cable testing (Very Low Frequency) is a technique for testing of medium and high voltage (MV and HV) cables. VLF systems are advantageous in that they can be manufactured to be small and lightweight; making them useful – especially for field testing where transport and space can be issues. Because the inherent capacitance of a power cable needs to be charged when energised, system frequency voltage sources are much larger, heavier and more expensive than their lower-frequency alternatives. Traditionally DC hipot testing was used for field testing of cables, but DC testing has been shown to be ineffective for withstand testing of modern cables with polymer based insulation (XLPE, EPR). DC testing has also been shown to reduce the remaining life of cables with aged polymer insulation.

VLF testing of cables is supported in IEC 60502 (up to 35 kV) and in IEEE 400.2 (up to 69 kV). As higher voltage VLF equipment is developed, standards may be adapted to increase the voltage level for application.

The VLF test can be used in a number of ways:

- Apply VLF to cables in a simple withstand approach to detect potential failures (faults) in the cable insulation during a planned outage. The tested cable must withstand an AC voltage for a specified testing time without flashover. This method yields a "pass/fail" statement. VLF cable testing uses different wave shapes - typically sine and square - and care must be taken when describing the voltage to be used. RMS and peak voltages have different relationships to each other depending on the wave shape and IEEE 400.2 uses the peak voltage level to equate the wave shapes. Frequency ranges used are within the range of 0.01 Hz to 0.1 Hz, where frequency selection depends on the load presented by the cable. Test voltage levels are either calculated using a multiple of the cable's nominal phase-phase voltage or via tables in IEEE 400.2; typically they are in the range of 1.5 U0 to 3 U0. The VLF cable testing time varies from 15 to 60 minutes. IEEE 400.2 establishes some suggested test voltages and times. Subsequent work by the CDFI has shown there to be no significant change in the efficacy of a VLF test conducted over the frequency range 0.1 to 0.01 Hz when the IEEE 400.2 voltages and times are used.
- Apply VLF to cables in a monitored withstand approach where a diagnostic measurement is made before and during the course of the withstand test. Monitoring a diagnostic enables some additional decision making before the final test voltage is reached. Some cables are not good candidates for withstand testing and a diagnostic indication obtained at a lower voltage can negate the need to perform withstand testing. During the test measurement of a diagnostic parameter can be used to optimise test times. Test times can be shortened for cables with good diagnostic indications or lengthened for cables that show deteriorating diagnostic measurements during the test.
- Apply VLF to measure insulation losses (i.e. the insulation dissipation factor or Tan-delta). In this case, the IEEE 400.2 establishes the criteria for assessment. The test is typically performed over a range of test voltages from 0.5 Uo to 2 Uo depending on the standard/guide that is being followed.
- Apply VLF in order to detect and measure partial discharge. In this case, the IEEE 400.3 outlines a procedure for assessment and IEC 60270 provides the background for partial discharge testing of high voltage apparatus. The test is typically performed over a range of test voltages to identify the different defects and their inception and extinction voltages.

== VLF Withstand Testing ==
High voltage withstand tests are used in conjunction with partial discharge measurements on solid dielectric cable and accessories within manufacturing plants to ensure the quality of completed cable system components from MV to EHV. Thus, it is quite natural for utilities to also use withstand and partial discharge tests as commissioning and maintenance tests for cable systems in the field. The goal of these tests is the same as in the factory test, namely to detect any defective components of the cable system before failure. Withstand tests can be conducted using a variety of voltage sources from DC to 300 Hz and are simple to operate and the equipment may be inexpensive. Some observations for the VLF withstand test are (Based on CDFI results):

- VLF tests are simple for a utility to perform and do not require specialized services
- The on-test failure rates on a cable system are in the range of 0.2 to 4% for 30 min tests performed at the IEEE 400.2 voltage levels.
- IEEE Std. 400.2 provides suggested time and voltage test levels but exact parameters are not possible since defect growth rates are not known and can vary widely.
- VLF tests at IEEE 400.2 test levels do not damage cable systems' 'good' insulation but are used to degrade existing insulation defects to failure during the test rather than in-service. The reasoning is that the low-energy failure of the cable under test results in less collateral damage and a reduced likelihood of unplanned outages due to in-service failure.
- Data has been collected using both of the commonly used VLF waveforms, there is little evidence of a significant difference in failure rate outcomes that can be ascribed to the voltage waveform when the recommend voltages are used.

== VLF Tan Delta Testing ==
Medium voltage distribution cables and their accessories form a critical part of power delivery systems. The systems employ insulation materials that have a low permittivity and loss. The permittivity and the loss are dielectric properties of the insulation material. As the systems age, these dielectric properties can change. The dielectric loss can be assessed since it can increase several orders of magnitude during the service life of the systems. This approach correlates well some lossy growths in aged polymeric insulation such as water trees.

Tan delta measurement constitutes a cable diagnostic technique that assesses the general condition of the cable system insulation, which can be represented in a simplified equivalent circuit that consists of two elements; a resistor and a capacitor. When voltage is applied to the system, the total current is the result of the contributions from the capacitor current and the resistor current. The tan delta is defined as the ratio between the resistive current and the capacitive current. The measurements are carried out offline.

In practice, it is convenient to measure the dielectric properties at a VLF of 0.1 Hz. This both reduces the size and power requirements of the energizing source and increases the resolution of the resistive component (near DC component) of dielectric loss (not the capacitive component).

Using the IEEE 400.2, three different criteria are applied for diagnosing a cable insulation system using the Tan δ value. One criterion uses the magnitude of the Tan δ value as a tool for diagnostics while the other uses the difference in Tan δ values for particular electrical stresses or voltage levels. The latter is commonly known as the “Tip-Up” of the Tan δ value. The results for both criteria are often interpreted using recommendations given in the guide. The guide provides a hierarchical level that evaluates the cable insulation system. The major caveats with this approach are:

- The source of the losses may need further testing in order to be located.
- For longer cables the loss contributions from damaged portions may be diluted in the measurement.
- Some insulation defects are not associated with losses.

== VLF Partial Discharge Testing ==
A VLF source can be used to energise insulation and initiate partial discharges from defects within the insulation. As the test is offline, the test voltage can be varied in order to measure the inception and extinction voltages of the partial discharge. TDR techniques can be used to localise the source of the discharge and a reference measurement can be made with a calibrator in order to present the measured pd in pC.

VLF PD measurements have the same benefits and limitations as other PD measurements and the data that is obtained using different voltage sources has the same uncertainties.

Different defects may exhibit different characteristics dependent upon the environment and the excitation source. The impact of this on the final decision is likely insignificant. Even at higher voltages the criteria for detection (e.g. in Cigre WG B1.28) and severity calculation are not defined and not dependent on the measured properties of the PD. Therefore, the detection of PD sources is currently more important than the characterisation of the defects.

Detection of defects is especially useful for new cables where the severity analysis is perhaps less important to the decision that is made. Any defects in new installations should be corrected. For aged systems the PD severity can be assessed by consideration of the various PD characteristics. Unfortunately there is no independent guide that can be used to classify the severity after a single measurement. A trend can be established from repeat measurements and it is therefore important that measurement conditions are carefully controlled and repeated so that the comparison of repeated measurements is valid.

Typical characteristics of PD that can contribute to severity analysis include:

- Inception and extinction voltages
- PD type classification (Internal, surface, corona)
- PD Magnitude (in mV/pC)
- PD repetition rate
- Location of defect

== Comparison with other voltage sources ==
There is some industry debate (much of it commercially driven) over the use of different voltage sources to energise cables and on the benefits of the different diagnostic techniques when used in conjunction with the different sources.

=== Theoretical Approach ===
The cable is subject to operational stresses at the system voltage and frequency and voltage sources that are different (in magnitude, waveshape or frequency) will provide different stresses to the cable than those experienced under operational conditions. Defects and damage may also respond differently and the diagnostic indications may be different depending upon the types of defects. Proponents of this approach will argue that these differences detract from the commercial benefits offered by the competing voltage sources.

=== Practical Approach ===
Electrical equipment has a failure rate which is the inverse of its reliability. Test techniques have the intention of improving the reliability of the insulation system and an analysis of the impact of the testing on the reliability of the network under test is evidence of the efficacy of the test technique; irrespective of the differences from operational stresses.

=== Probability ===
Insulation failure is a stochastic process and it is erroneous to identify single events and attribute this to a particular source. Failure of an insulation system after a good diagnostic indication (or vice versa) is to be expected for any test using any voltage source. Better tests will be better predictors of condition but no tests should be considered infallible.

== International standards and guides ==
- DIN VDE 0276 (after laying tests on new cables)
- IEC 60502-2:2014 Cables for rated voltages from 6 kV (Um = 7,2 kV) up to 30 kV (Um = 36 kV) (after laying tests on new cables)
- IEEE 400-2012 Guide for Field Testing and Evaluation of the Insulation of Shielded Power Cable Systems Rated 5 kV and Above
- IEEE 400.2-2013 Guide for Field Testing of Shielded Power Cable Systems Using Very Low Frequency (VLF)
- CENELEC HD620 S1 (after laying tests on new cables)

== See also ==
- Short circuit
- Dielectric withstand test
- Dissipation factor
- Partial discharge
