= Battery isolator =

A battery isolator, also known as a split-charge diode, is an electrical device used in multi‑battery electrical systems to permit a single direct current (DC) charging source, such as a vehicle alternator, to supply power to more than one battery while preventing electrical interaction between the batteries.

In typical installations, the isolator employs one‑way current control devices (such as diodes or solid‑state switches) so that current from the charging source is directed into each battery circuit without allowing one battery to discharge into another. This arrangement enables simultaneous charging of multiple batteries from the same alternator without the batteries being directly connected in parallel, thereby helping to maintain battery charge and protect each battery from backfeeding into another during operation.

== Advantages and disadvantages ==
This is beneficial because a weak or dead battery will drain the charge from a strong battery if both are connected directly together. The disadvantage to an isolator is added cost and complexity, and if a diode-type isolator is used (which is very common) there is additional voltage drop in the circuit between the charging source and the batteries.

== Uses ==
Battery isolators are commonly used on recreational vehicles, boats, utility vehicles, airplanes, and large trucks where one battery is dedicated to starting and running the engine and another battery or batteries run accessory loads. A battery isolator helps to ensure that the starting battery has sufficient power to start the engine and recharge the batteries if, for example, loads on the auxiliary battery (e.g., refrigerator or navigation lights) cause it to be drained, or if an auxiliary battery fails. Isolators are also used in vehicles with large, high-power car stereos and off road vehicles to accommodate high current loads such as a recovery winch.

== Components ==
Several technologies have been used to achieve control of DC in this manner: silicon rectifier packages, Schottky rectifier packages, MOSFET rectifier packages, and conventional mechanical relays.

== Battery Combiner ==
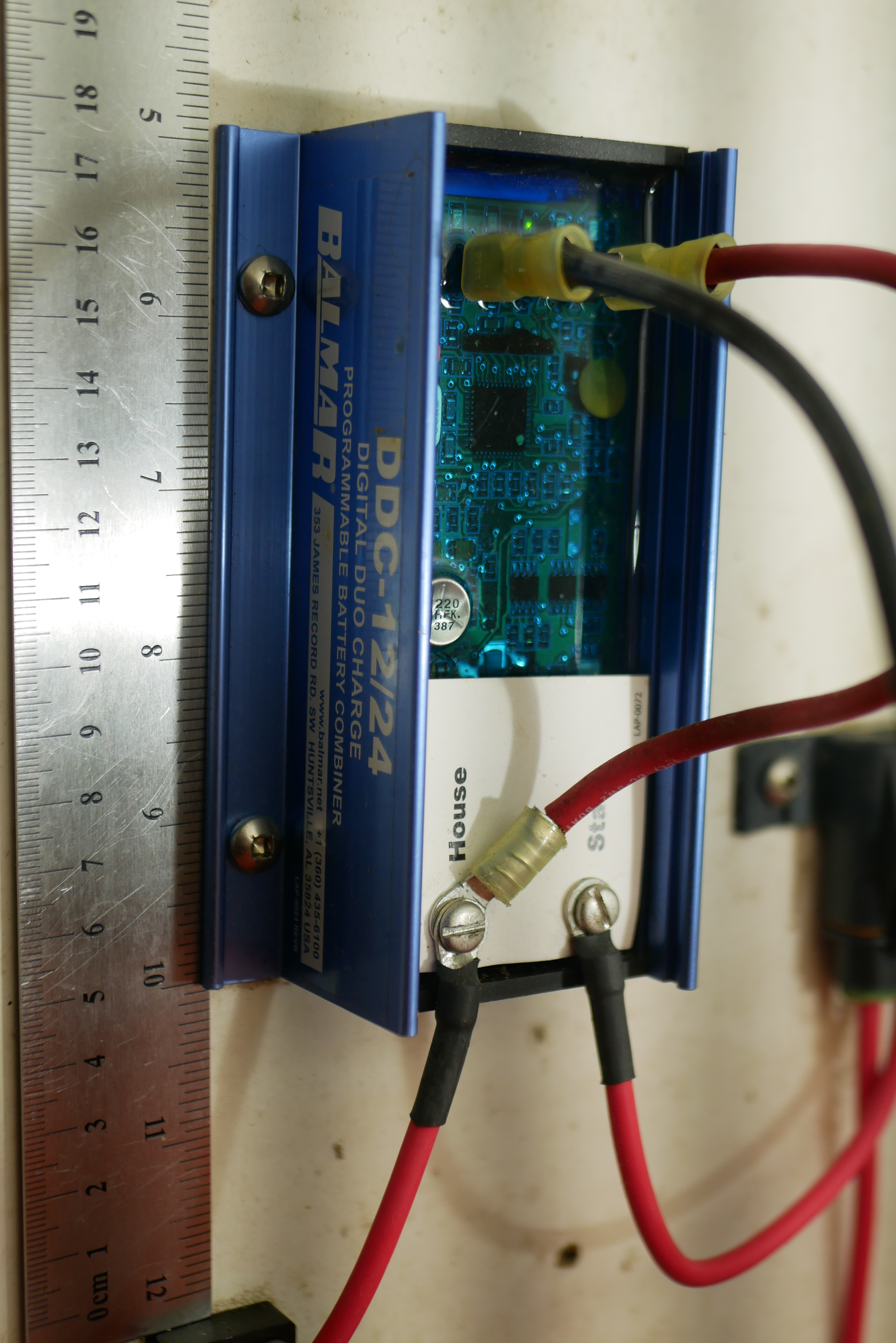
Balmar Digital Dual Charge Programmable Battery Combiner

A recent innovation, also called a charge-splitter, extends the functionality of traditional isolators, in that they actively sense battery voltage and dynamically control current flow, rather than providing continuous passive one-way current.

== Battery management technology ==
Battery isolators represent a precursor to contemporary battery management system architectures, providing the basic protective and control functions that later systems expanded with electronic intelligence and real-time management capabilities.

== See also ==
- Isolator switch
- Voltage sensitive relay (VSR)
- DC–DC charger
