= Ányos Jedlik =

Hungarian physicist and Roman Catholic priest (1800–1895)

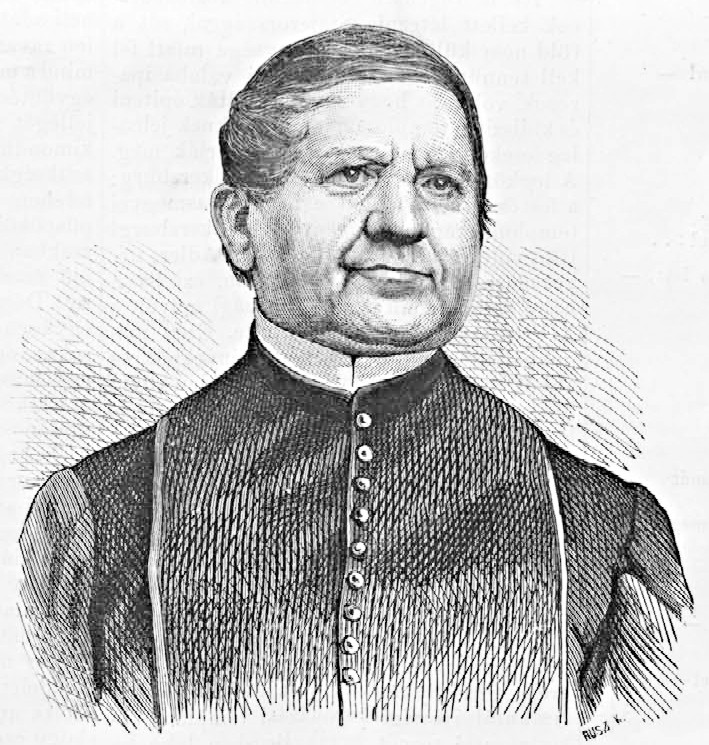
- Portrait by Károly Rusz, 1866
- Born: Ányos István Jedlik; 11 January 1800; Szimő, Kingdom of Hungary (today Zemné, Slovakia)
- Died: 13 December 1895 (aged 95); Győr, Kingdom of Hungary, Austria-Hungary
- Citizenship: Hungarian
- Known for: Electric motor, dynamo, self-excitation, impulse generator, Cascade connection
- Scientific career
- Fields: Inventor, engineer, physicist

Ányos István Jedlik (1800 – 1895) (Note: (Hungarian: Jedlik Ányos István; Slovak: Štefan Anián Jedlík; in older texts and publications: Latin: Stephanus Anianus Jedlik; 11 January 1800 – 13 December 1895)) was a Hungarian inventor, engineer, physicist, and Benedictine priest. He was also a member of the Hungarian Academy of Sciences, and author of several books. He is considered by Hungarians and Slovaks to be the unsung father of the dynamo and electric motor.

== Career ==
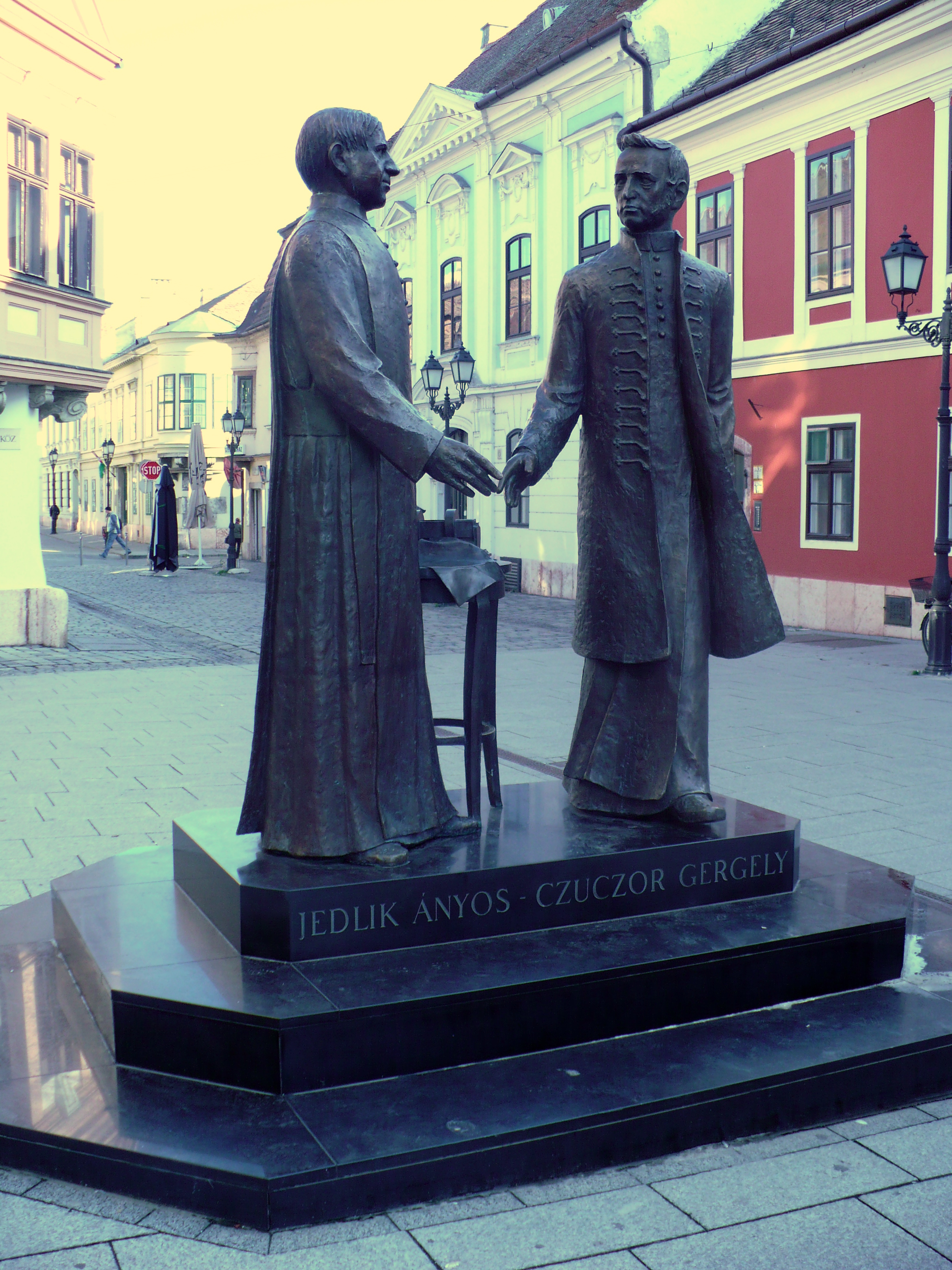
Statue of Jedlik and his cousin Gergely Czuczor in Győr

He was born in Szimő, Kingdom of Hungary (today Zemné, Slovakia). His parents were Ferenc Jedlik and Rozália Szabó. His mother was a member of a Hungarian noble family, while his paternal grandfather was of Slovak origin moving in 1720 from Liptó County to Szimő.

Jedlik's education began at high schools in Nagyszombat (today Trnava) and Pozsony (today Bratislava). In 1817 he became a Benedictine, and from that time continued his studies at the schools of that order, where he was known by his Latin name Stephanus Anianus. In 1818-20 he studied humanities at the Lyceum of the Benedictine Order in Győr, then in 1822 he obtained a doctorate in 1822 in Pest, and passed examinations in mathematics, physics, philosophy and history. He was ordained a priest in 1825. In 1825, the Benedictine Order decided that he should teach at the grammar school of Győr, and later at the Physics Department of the school. In the meantime, he was constantly expanding the workshop of the school, very often making his own tools, and creating his first inventions. From 1831 he taught at the Royal Academy in Pozsony. From 1840, he was appointed professor of physics-mechanics at the Budapest University of Sciences. Few guessed at that time that his activities would play an important part in bringing up a new generation of physicists. He became the dean of the Faculty of Arts in 1848, and by 1863 he was rector of the university. From 1858 he was a corresponding member of the Hungarian Academy of Sciences and from 1873 was an honorary member. After his retirement, he continued working and spent his last years in complete seclusion at the priory in Győr, where he died. He was a prolific author.

In the Kingdom of Hungary, Latin was the official language until 1844, and thus it was also the language of instruction in all higher education institutions. In 1845, for the first time in Hungarian history, at a university chair, it was Ányos Jedlik, who spoke in Hungarian language instead of Latin during the lectures.
His cousin Gergely Czuczor, a Hungarian linguist, asked him to create a Hungarian technical vocabulary in physics, the first of its kind, by which he became one of its founders.

== Scientific work ==
=== Electric motor ===
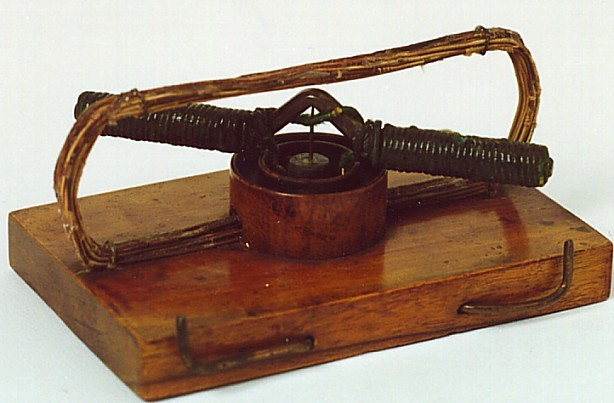
Jedlik's "lightning-magnetic self-rotor", 1827 (the world's first electric motor)

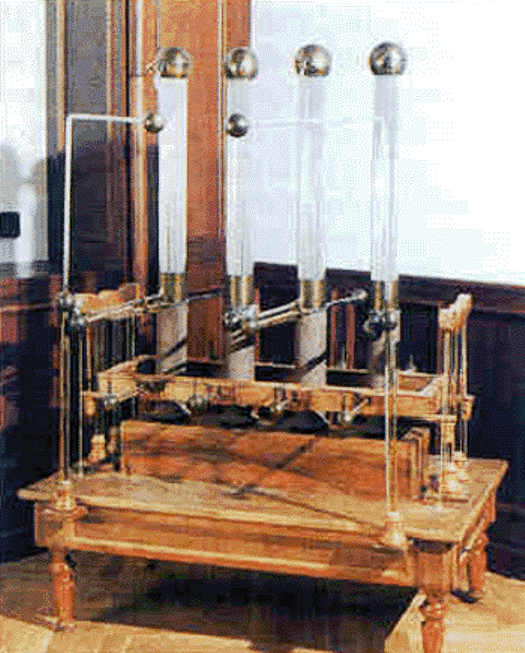
Jedlik's tubular voltage generator, which is probably the earliest impulse generator

In 1820, Hans Christian Ørsted published his discovery that a compass needle was deflected from magnetic north by a nearby electric current, confirming a direct relationship between electricity and magnetism. Ørsted's experiment sparked Jedlik's interest in research into the phenomena of electromagnetic motion.

At the grammar school of Győr in 1827, Jedlik started experimenting with electromagnetic rotating devices which he called lightning-magnetic self-rotors, and in 1828 he demonstrated the first device which contained the three main components of practical direct current motors: the stator, rotor, and commutator. In the prototype both the stationary and the revolving parts were electromagnetic. The first electromotor, built in 1828, and Jedlik's operating instructions are kept at the Museum of Applied Arts in Budapest. The motor still works perfectly today. However, Jedlik only reported his invention decades later and the true date of it is uncertain (late December 1827 or early January 1828). He had the necessary props and tools made by the craftsmen in Győr. He carefully recorded his experiments, and in his notebook, under the number 290, he described the electric motor: "a wire carrying an electromagnetic current makes a continuous rotating movement around a similar electromagnet".

=== Invention of the Dynamo principle ===
Jedlik's best known invention is the principle of dynamo self-excitation.

The self-excitation replaced the permanent magnet designs in the industry.

He was ahead of his contemporaries in his scientific work, but he did not speak about his most important invention, his prototype dynamo, until 1856; it was not until 1861 that he mentioned it in writing in a list of inventory of the university. Although that document might serve as evidence of Jedlik's being the first dynamo, the invention of the dynamo is linked to Siemens's name because Jedlik's invention did not rise to notice at that time.

In the prototype of the single-pole electric starter, both the stationary and the revolving parts were electromagnetic. In essence, the concept is that instead of permanent magnets, two opposed electromagnets induce the magnetic field around the rotor. He formulated the concept of the self-excited dynamo about 1861, six years before Siemens and Wheatstone.

As one side of the coil passes in front of the north pole, crossing the line of force, a current is induced. As the frame rotates further the current diminishes, then arriving at the front of the south pole it rises again but flows in the opposite direction. The frame is connected to a commutator, thus the current always flows in the same direction in the external circuit.

=== The first impulse generator ===
In 1863 he discovered the possibility of voltage multiplication and in 1868 demonstrated it with a "tubular voltage generator", which was successfully displayed at the Vienna World Exposition in 1873. It was an early form of the impulse generators now applied in nuclear research. The jury of the World Exhibition of 1873 (chaired by Ernst Werner von Siemens) in Vienna awarded his voltage multiplying condenser of cascade connection with a prize "For Development". Through this condenser, Jedlik framed the principle of surge generation by cascaded connection. (The cascade connection was another important invention of Ányos Jedlik)

=== Optics ===
In 1814, Joseph von Fraunhofer discovered that heated materials emit light in specific colour ranges. But to analyse the resulting lines accurately, a continuous spectrum was needed. Since Newton, this has been solved by resolving white light with a prism. However, optical gratings were used to obtain a more useful, broader spectrum. Not satisfied with the instruments available at the time, Jedlik set about designing a new machine, which became a continuous development effort that lasted for three decades. In the meantime, the instrument maker working for him essentially laid the foundations of Hungarian fine mechanical instrument making. In the early 1840s, grids with 300-400 strokes per millimetre appeared abroad. However, the spacing of the lines was not uniform, so they did not produce a perfect colour image.

Jedlik's aim was therefore not to increase the number of lines, but to make the spacing of the scratches even. By 1860 he had a machine that worked accurately. It took about 10 seconds to draw a line, after which the needle would rise and the machine would push the point corresponding to the end of the next line under the needle. It took several days to complete a single grid - 12 000 lines - so he used another of his inventions, the electric motor, to drive the machine. The machine worked automatically, powered by electric motor. He made several types of grids: linear, cross and circular. The production of the grids required a great deal of chemical knowledge and experimentation (the glass was fine-coated, scratched and the scratched surface etched) until Jedlik found the most suitable materials. His excellent optical gratings became known and sought after. An optician in Paris, from whom Jedlik had once bought a clockwork arc lamp, became the main distributor. Jedlik's gratings won the respect of experts for their precision and high brightness. They helped to achieve a wavelength resolution of the spectrum below nanometres (10^{–9} m). Its optical gratings, with more than 2,000 lines per millimetre, were still used for spectroscopy even in the 1960s.

=== Galvanic batteries and arc-lighting ===
From the 1840s, Jedlik began to work on improving the batteries because of the high power requirements of arc-lighting. By studying the best batteries of the time, the Bunsen batteries, he realised that he could achieve his goal by reducing the internal resistance. Instead of the single-acid immersion batteries he had been using, he created two-fluid batteries in which the two types of acid were separated first by clay fragments and later by impregnated paper. He sent such elements to the 1855 Paris World Exhibition, but they were destroyed by careless transport. The committee was only able to examine a few intact cells, and these were found to have a higher energy density than the original Bunsen cells. This result was rewarded with a bronze medal, and a plant was set up in Pest to manufacture them. His batteries become well known and sought after the exhibition, and were exported to Paris and even Constantinople.[13] He also demonstrated the batteries and arc lamp lighting in Pannonhalma in 1856.

"In the evening, we presented the 22-piece electric battery farm of Jedlik in the quadrangle courtyard of the ancient monastery of Pannonhalma. Despite of the full moon, the light was so strong and the church became so bright that the steeple seemed to be "on fire" and the villagers of Szentmárton were already rushing towards the hill with buckets in their hands to put out the "fire."

=== Soda bottle ===
Jedlik is credited with inventing the first soda bottle in 1826. The first carbonated water manufacturing plant was built in Budapest in 1841, manufacturing soda bottles based on Jedlik's design. In 2012, the town of Győr honoured his invention by erecting a fountain in the shape of a giant soda bottle, in the town's Gutenberg square.

== Recognitions and awards ==
The Jedlik Ányos Secondary Grammar School is named after him.

- 1855 - Bronze medal at the Paris World Exhibition for his battery
- 1858 - Full member of the Hungarian Academy of Sciences
- 1858 - Grand Prize of the Hungarian Academy of Sciences for his textbook "The Natural Science of Heavy Bodies"
- 1863 - Member No. 1 of the Royal Hungarian Society of Natural Sciences
- 1863 - Member of the Teachers' Examination Committee
- 1863 - Rector of the University of Pest
- 1864 - Protector of the University of Pest
- 1867 - Royal Councillor (appointed by Franz Joseph)
- 1873 - "Medal for Progress" awarded by Werner von Siemens at the Vienna World Exhibition
- 1873 - Honorary Member of the Hungarian Academy of Sciences
- 1879 - Second Class Order of the Iron Crown
- 1891 - First full member of the Mathematical and Physical Society of the Hungarian Academy of Sciences

== Bibliography ==
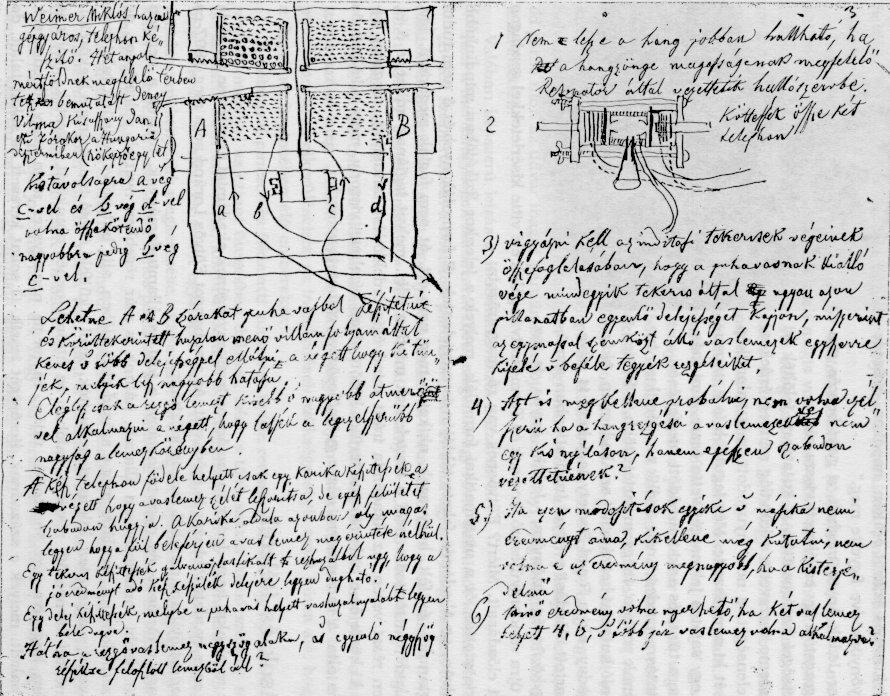
Drawn plan of a "telephon" by Ányos Jedlik in Hungarian. Pannonhalma Archabbey, Kingdom of Hungary.

=== Books for university students ===
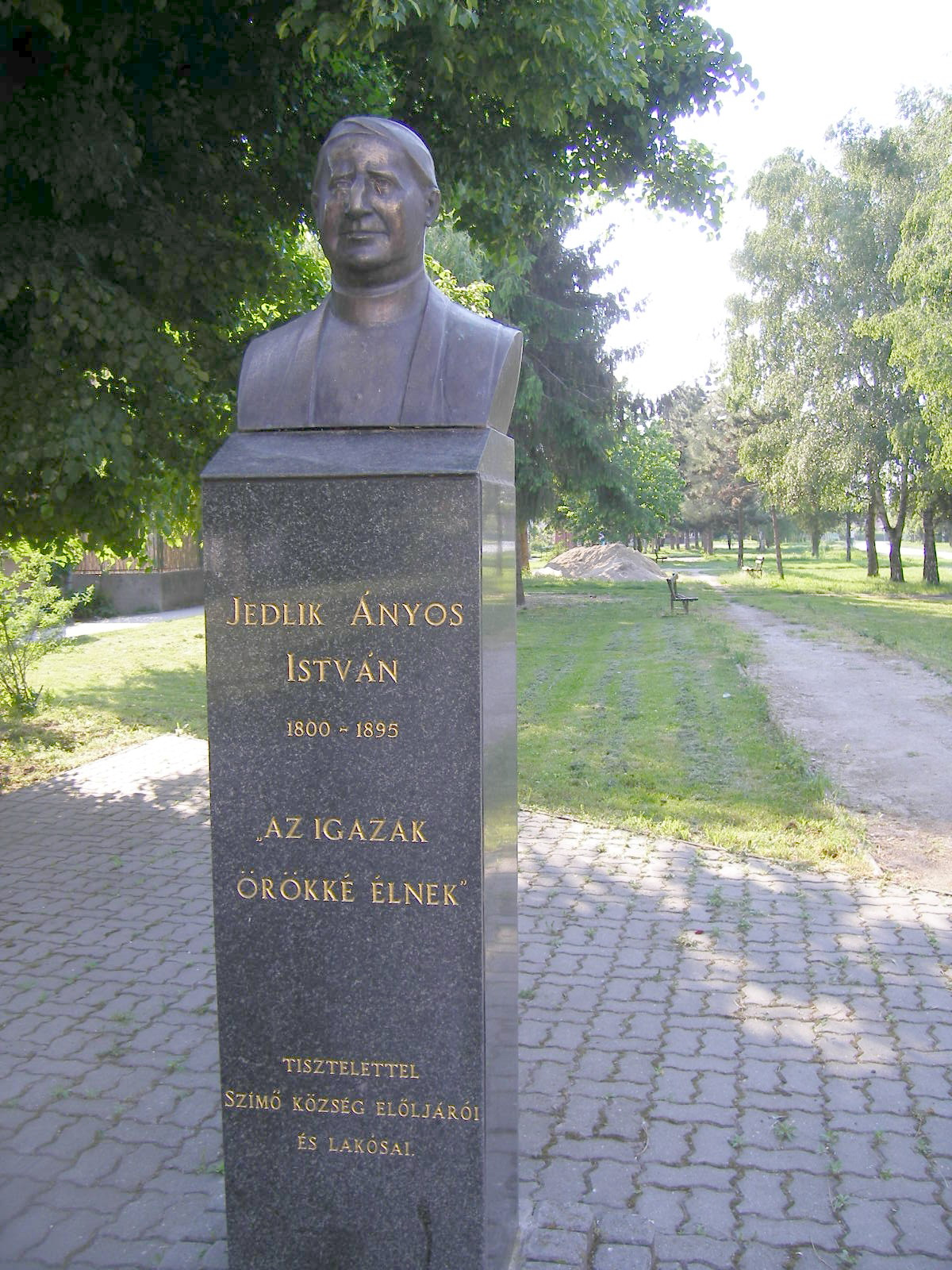
Jedlik's bust in his native village of Zemné

The following are all given in the Hungarian Electronic Library:

1. Tentamen publicum e Physica ... ex Institutine primi semestris Aniani Jedlik [Public examination on Physics ... from the first semester education of Ányos Jedlik] (in Latin). Pozsony. 1839.
2. Tentamen publicum e Physica quod in regia univers. Hung. e praelectionibus [Public examination on Physics for election to the Royal Hungarian University] (in Latin). Pest: Trattner-Károlyi. 1845.
3. Mathesis adplicata [Applied Science] (in Latin). Pest: Kőnyomat.
4. Compendium Hydrostaticae et Hydrodinamicae usibus Auditorum Suorum adaptatum per Anianum Jedlik [Compendium of Hydrostatics and Hydrodynamics. Lecture Notes adapted by Ányos Jedlik] (in Latin). Pest: Kőnyomat. 1847.
5. Elements of natural science. Vol. 16. Pest: Eisinfels. 1850.
6. Viznyugtanhoz tartozó Pótlékok [Supplements for science of still/calm water] (in Hungarian). Pest: Kőnyomat. 1850.
7. Goldsmith, Irta (1851). Ányos Jedlik (ed.). Fénytan [Science of Light] (in Hungarian). Pest: Kőnyomat.
8. Goldsmith, Irta (1990) [1851]. Ányos Jedlik (ed.). Hőtan [Science of Heat] (in Hungarian). Budapest: Műszaki Könyvkiadó.

Contributions by Jedlik in other works:

1. Vagács, Caesar, ed. (1854). "A hévmérő s kellékei" [The thermometer and its accessories]. Olvasmány a főgymnasiumi középosztályok [Reading material for grammar school students] (in Hungarian). Hartleben. pp. 259–261.
2. ibid., pp. 256–258
3. Német – magyar tudományos műszótár a csász. kir. gymnasiumok és reáliskolák számára [German – Hungarian Scientific Dictionary for Imperial and Royal grammar schools and primary schools] (in German and Hungarian). Vol. VIII. Pest: Hekenast. 1858.
4. "Ueber die Anwendung des Elektro-Magnetes bei elektro-dynamischen Rotationen" [On the application of electromagnets in electrodynamic rotations]. Aemtlicher Bericht über die XXXII. Versammlung deutscher Naturforscher und Aerzte zu Wien im Sept. 1856 [Report of the 32nd Conference of German Naturalists and Physicists at Vienna, September 1856] (in German). Vienna: K. Gerold's Sohn. 1858. pp. 170–175.
5. "Modification der Grove'schen und Bunsen'schen Batterie" [Modification of the Grove and Bunsen batteries]. Aemtlicher Bericht über die XXXII. Versammlung deutscher Naturforscher und Aerzte zu Wien im Sept. 1856 [Report of the 32nd Conference of German Naturalists and Physicists at Vienna, September 1856] (in German). Vienna: K. Gerold's Sohn. 1858. pp. 176–178.
6. Egyetemes Magyar Encyclopaedia [Universal Hungarian Encyclopaedia] (in Hungarian). Vol. 1–13. Pest: Szent István Társulat. 1859–1876.

== See also ==
- List of Roman Catholic scientist-clerics
