= Wet leakage current test =

Electrical withstanding test

The wet leakage current test is an electrical withstanding test carried out on electrical appliances to test the electrical isolation of the housing. The test is carried out by submersing the appliance into water with one lead attached to the electrical leads of the appliance, and the other lead connected to the water. It is often carried out on photovoltaic modules in order to qualify them for IEC61646 or IEC61625 certification.
