= Impulse generator =

Electrical device designed to produce short high-voltage or high-current surges

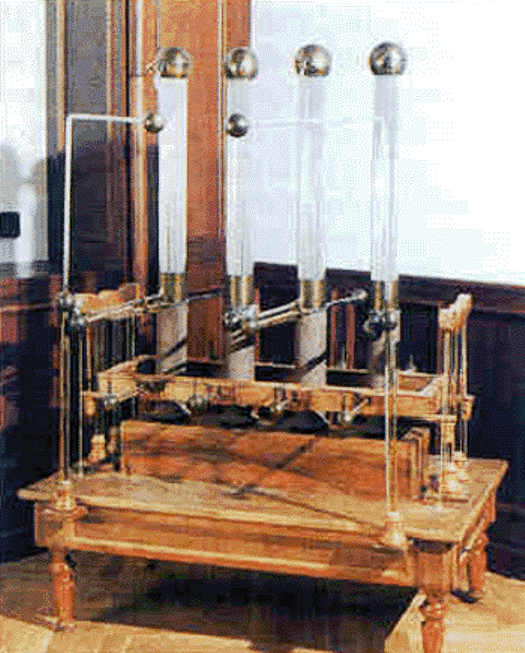
Jedlik's tubular voltage generator

An impulse generator is an electrical apparatus which produces very short high-voltage or high-current surges. Such devices can be classified into two types: impulse voltage generators and impulse current generators. High impulse voltages are used to test the strength of electric power equipment against lightning and switching surges. Also, steep-front impulse voltages are sometimes used in nuclear physics experiments. High impulse currents are needed not only for tests on equipment such as lightning arresters and fuses but also for many other technical applications such as lasers, thermonuclear fusion, and plasma devices.

== Jedlik's tubular voltage generator ==
In 1863 Hungarian physicist Ányos Jedlik discovered the possibility of voltage multiplication and in 1868 demonstrated it with a "tubular voltage generator", which was successfully displayed at the Vienna World Exposition in 1873. It was an early form of the impulse generators now applied in nuclear research.

The jury of the World Exhibition of 1873 in Vienna awarded his voltage multiplying condenser of cascade connection with prize "For Development". Through this condenser, Jedlik framed the principle of surge generator of cascaded connection. (The Cascade connection was another important invention of Ányos Jedlik.)

== Marx generator ==
One form is the Marx generator, named after Erwin Otto Marx, who first proposed it in 1923. This consists of multiple capacitors that are first charged in parallel through charging resistors as by a high-voltage, direct-current source and then connected in series and discharged through a test object by a simultaneous spark-over of the spark gaps. The impulse current generator comprises many capacitors that are also charged in parallel by a high-voltage, low-current, direct-current source, but it is discharged in parallel through resistances, inductances, and a test object by a spark gap.

== See also ==
- Pulsed power
- Pulse-forming network
- Marx generator
- Cockcroft–Walton generator
- Fuse (electrical)
- Laser
- Nuclear fusion
- Particle accelerator
- Plasma (physics)
