= Glossary of electrical and electronics engineering =

This glossary of electrical and electronics engineering is a list of definitions of terms and concepts related specifically to electrical engineering and electronics engineering. For terms related to engineering in general, see Glossary of engineering.

== A ==
AC adapter
An external power supply for portable devices that allows them to operate from wall-socket electricity.
AC power plugs and sockets
Electrical connectors used with alternating current.
AC power
Electric power where the current reverses direction periodically.
AC-to-DC conversion (rectifier)
Rectification of AC current, so that current flows in only one direction.
AC-to-AC converter
A power converter where the input and output are both in the form of alternating current (AC), but may differ in frequency or other characteristics.
AC/DC receiver design
A radio receiver that can operate from either alternating current or direct current wall socket power.
active rectification
A circuit where rectifier devices are externally controlled to change AC to current flowing in one direction.
actuator
An end device of a control system that manipulates a physical variable such as a valve opening or the position of a machine part.
adaptive control
A control strategy where parameters are adjusted as the controlled process changes.
additive white Gaussian noise
A noise model that is used in telecommunications to model the effects of various random processes.
adjustable-speed drive
Control for a motor that allows more than one speed to be selected.
advanced z-transform
A mathematical technique used to model and analyze digital systems.
affinity laws
Mathematical formulas that relate the speed, flow, and diameter of pumps, fans, blowers, and turbines, useful for predicting output under varying conditions.
agbioeletric
A brand name of a kind of vegetable oil for use in transformers.
AIEE
American Institute of Electrical Engineers, predecessor organization to IEEE.
alpha–beta transformation
A mathematical technique useful in analysis of three-phase circuits.
alternating current (AC)
Electric current that periodically reverses direction and changes its magnitude continuously with time, in contrast to direct current (DC), which flows in only one direction.
alternator
An electrical machine that converts mechanical power into AC electric power.
alternator synchronization
The process of synchronizing an alternator to a grid or to another alternator.
aluminium smelting
The reduction of aluminium ore to metal, by use of large amounts of electric power.
ammeter
An instrument that measures electric current.
amorphous metal transformer
A power transformer where the metallic core is made of metals cooled so quickly that they do not form a crystal structure; such transformers can reduce some kinds of energy loss.
ampacity
The current-carrying capacity of a conductor, in the context of electric power wiring.
ampere (A)

The SI unit of electric current, equal to one coulomb (C) passing a given point in an electrical circuit per second.
Ampère's circuital law

The mathematical relation between the integral of the magnetic field over some closed curve to the current passing through the region bound by the curve.
Ampère's force law
The mathematical relation between the force between two current-carrying conductors and the current flowing in them.
Ampère's law
See Ampère's circuital law.
amplidyne
An electric machine that allows a small current to control a much larger current.
amplifier
A system that produces an output that replicates an input signal but with a larger magnitude.
amplitude modulation
Transmission of information by changing the magnitude of a carrier signal, for example sending sound by radio.
analog circuit
A circuit where currents and voltages vary continually within some practical range, in proportion to some signal.
analog filter
An analog circuit that alters some frequency-related property of a signal.
analog signal processing
Generally, techniques used to alter signals that rely on voltages or currents that vary continually over a practical range.
analog signal
A signal whose properties (current, voltage) vary proportionally to the information transmitted.
analog-to-digital converter
A circuit that produces a number proportional to the magnitude of a voltage or current.
anode
The terminal of an electrochemical or electronic device through which conventional current flows inward.
antenna
A structure which converts between electromagnetic waves in space and currents in a conductor.
apparent power
In an alternating current power circuit, the product of the magnitude of RMS voltage and current.
Apple Inc. (formerly known as Apple Computer)
A company that makes mobile telephones and computers.
arbitrary waveform generator
A type of signal generator that can generate almost any waveform.
arc converter
A device once used to generate radio waves.
arc furnace
A furnace that melts materials with the intense heat produced by an electric arc.
arc lamp
An electric lamp that generates visible light from an electric arc.
arc welder
A device used to join metals by melting them with the intense heat produced by an electric arc.
armature
That part of an electrical machine that converts electrical energy to mechanical energy (or vice versa).
artificial intelligence (AI)
A computer system that replicates some feature of human intelligence.
artificial neural network
A network of individual logic elements in multiple layers that mimics the functions of a biological nervous system; a technique in artificial intelligence.
asymptotic stability
A condition of a control system where the output eventually reaches a steady-state value in response to any input.
asynchronous circuit
A digital circuit where states propagate through a circuit without a synchronizing clock impulse.
audio and video connector
An electrical fitting used to connect cables carrying audio or video signals.
audio equipment
Equipment used to handle signals at frequencies within the human range of hearing.
audio filter
A circuit intended to alter some frequency-related property of a signal carrying sound information.
audio frequency
A signal whose frequency is within the range of human hearing.
audio noise reduction
Reduction of interfering signals in an audio signal.
audio signal processing
Alteration of any properties of a signal carrying sound information (dynamic range, frequency response, or others).
audion tube
An early three-electrode vacuum tube that had amplifying properties.
Austin transformer
A kind of isolation transformer.
automatic gain control
A circuit that automatically adjusts the magnitude of a signal to prevent it from becoming too small or too large.
automatic transfer switch
An electrical switch used to automatically select a standby source of electrical power when the principal source is lost.
automation
Automatic control of a process.
autorecloser
A circuit protection device for overhead power distribution lines which briefly interrupts a circuit when a fault is detected, then restores the circuit in the expectation the fault has cleared.
autotransformer
A transformer where the primary and secondary circuits share some of the transformer windings.
availability factor
The fraction of time that a power plant is available to produce power.
avalanche diode
A diode intended for regular operation in the reverse, avalanche breakdown, mode. Used as a voltage reference, noise source, and in certain classes of microwave oscillator device.
average rectified value
The average value of an alternating current waveform, taking the absolute value of the waveform. The average value is generally different from the root-mean-square value.

== B ==
backward wave oscillator
A type of micowave oscillator vacuum tube.
balanced line
A transmission line with two conductors, with equal impedances to earth ground.
ball bearing motor
A conceptual motor that does not use electromagnetism.
balun
A device that connects a balanced transmission line to an unbalanced line.
band-pass filter
A filter that lets through signals within a range of frequencies.
band-stop filter
A filter that blocks signals with a particular range of frequencies.
bandwidth
The range of frequencies over which a system generates or uses significant signal power.
bang-bang control
A controller that switches a final element on or off instead of providing a proportional response.
Barlow's wheel
A demonstration of electromagnetic principles.
Bartlett's bisection theorem
A mathematical theorem used in network analysis.
base load power plant
An electric power plant that furnishes the part of the load that does not vary during a day.
battery
An electrochemical device that produces electric power from chemical reactions.
battery eliminator
An AC adapter, which allows battery operated equipment to run on wall-socket AC power.
Bayer filter
An optical filter used in color digital cameras.
beam tetrode
A type of vacuum tube with four active elements plus a pair of beam forming plates.
beat frequency
A frequency produced by non-linear mixing of signals at two other frequencies.
Bell Telephone Laboratories
Formerly, the research and development laboratory of the American Telephone and Telegraph Corporation.
biasing
The practice of setting the quiescent operating conditions of an amplifying device to obtain desired response.
BIBO stability
A control system that produces finite outputs for any finite input.
bilinear transform
A mathematical technique to obtain the parameters for a digital filter to duplicate the response of some analog filter transfer function.
bimetallic strip
A temperature-sensing element made of two metals that have different coefficients of expansion which have been intimately bonded together.
Biot–Savart law
The mathematical relationship between a magnetic field and the current producing that field.
bipolar junction transistor
A type of transistor with two kinds of charge carriers.
blocked rotor test
A test of an electric machine where the machine is energized but the shaft is prevented from turning.
Blu-ray
A type of optical disc written and read using a blue/violet laser.
Bode plot
A plot of the amplitude and phase frequency response of a system, where the actual response is approximated by straight-line segments.
Boolean algebra
A type of algebra that deals with values that can only hold values "true" and "false", of great use in design and analysis of digital systems.
boost converter
Any power converter circuit that can produce an output voltage larger than its input voltage.
booster
A device used to increase voltage on an electric power distribution system, such as a motor-generator set on a DC system.
bound charge
Electric charge in a material that is not free to move through the material.
braking chopper
A device used to absorb energy from a motor to slow it down.
branch circuit
In building wiring, any circuit from the main panelboard to utilization equipment or receptacles.
breakdown voltage
The maximum voltage a device can withstand without damage.
bridge rectifier
A set of rectifier diodes used to convert alternating current to direct current.
broadcasting
Transmission of a signal to many receivers.
brush
A sliding electrical contact between a moving part and a stationary part.
brushed DC electric motor
An electric motor with brushes.
brushless DC electric motor
An electric motor without brushes.
Buchholz relay
A gas pressure sensing device for protection of oil-filled transformers.
Buck converter
Any power converter circuit that produces an output voltage less than its input voltage.
Buck–boost converter
Any power converter circuit that can provide a voltage greater or less than its input voltage.
Buck–boost transformer
A transformer that can be used to adjust voltage.
busbar
A set of conductors used to distribute current to many branches.
bushing
An electrical fitting used to connect external conductors to the interior of apparatus.
Butterworth filter
A type of filter with the flattest possible pass band.
buzzer
An electromechanical or electronic device that produces a sound when energized.

== C ==
Canadian Electrical Code
The technical standard for building wiring in Canada.
Canadian Standards Association
Non-profit organization that develops electrical and other technical standards.
capacitance
The ability of a body to hold an electrical charge.
capacitor
An electrical component that stores energy in an electric field.
capacitor-input filter
A power supply network where a capacitor is the first element following the rectifier.
capacitor voltage transformer
In electrical power systems, an instrument transformer for measuring voltage that uses a capacitive voltage divider.
capacity factor
The ratio of energy produced by a power plant over some period, over its maximum possible energy production in that time.
carrier current
A system for communications where a carrier signal is impressed on power line wiring.
carrier wave
A radio wave that can be modulated (changed systematically) to carry information to a receiver.
Category 3 cable
A performance standard for unshielded twisted pair cables for analog voice and low speed data circuits within a building.
Category 5e cable
A performance standard for unshielded twisted pair cables for telephone and data within a building.
Category 6 cable
A performance standard for unshielded twisted pair cables for telephone and high speed data within a building.
catenary
A geometric form of curve, the shape of a uniform cable hanging between two supports.
cathode ray oscilloscope
An electronic instrument that displays the wave shape of electrical signals on a cathode ray tube.
cathode ray tube
A vacuum tube that relies on an electron beam – usually used to render images on a fluorescent screen such as in television sets.
cathode
The terminal of an electrochemical or electronic device from which conventional current exits the device.
cat's-whisker detector
A radio detector that uses a manually-set "whisker" contact to a crystal of galena or other material, to form a rectifying junction.
CATV
Cable television, distribution of television programming over a wire instead of by radio broadcast.
cavity magnetron
A vacuum tube that is a high power microwave oscillator, using a resonant cavity and electrons traveling through a magnetic field.
CD
A "Compact Disc" used to store digital data or digitally recorded sound using an infrared laser.
center tap
A connection on a transformer which has equal voltage to either end of the transformer winding.
ceramic resonator
A piezoelectric element used to stabilize the frequency of an oscillator.
channel
Any communication path between a signal transmitter and a signal receiver, or, a pre-selected operating frequency for a radio system.
channel capacity
An upper bound on the rate at which information can be reliably transmitted over a communication channel.
charactron
A kind of text display vacuum tube that used an internal element to shape an electron beam to represent the shape of letters and other symbols.
charge pump
A DC to DC converter circuit that uses capacitors to store energy between stages.
charge transfer switch
A kind of charge pump circuit.
charge-coupled device
An imaging sensor or data storage device that represents a signal, or pixel, by the charge stored in a capacitor and is able to move that charge from one capacitor to the next.
Chebyshev filter
A form of filter that has a steep frequency selective characteristic.
choke
An induction coil used to block alternating current and pass direct current, or to block high frequencies and pass lower frequencies.
chopper
A circuit that switches on and off at a high rate, used either for power conversion or to convert a DC signal to a more easily processed AC signal.
circle diagram
A representation of the voltage and current characteristics of an electrical machine; the plot traces out a circle or part of a circle.
circuit breaker panel
A distribution board for electric power that uses circuit breakers as protective elements.
circuit breaker
An automatically operated electrical switch that opens to interrupt a short circuit or other fault.
circuit theory
The mathematical theory of electrical circuits.
Circuit Total Limitation (CTL)
A US National Electrical Code rule for the number of circuits in a panel board.
clamp meter
An ammeter that measures current with a split core that can be clamped on a wire.
Clapp oscillator
An electronic oscillator circuit that uses three capacitors and an inductor.
class of accuracy in electrical measurements
A measure of the error produced by an electrical measuring instrument.
closed-loop controller
Any controller that manipulates some process variable to minimize the difference between the current state of the variable and the desired set point, such as temperature, flow, or others.
CMOS
Complementary metal–oxide–semiconductor, a fabrication process for MOSFETs and integrated circuits
coaxial cable
A cable with an inner conductor centered inside a flexible tubular conductor, used for radio frequency transmission lines.
Cockcroft–Walton generator
A kind of circuit for generating very high DC voltage.
cogeneration
Production of electricity along with some other desired product, such as process steam or desalinated water.
cold cathode
An element of a vacuum tube that emits electrons without a heating circuit.
Colossus
A British code breaking system used during World War II.
combined cycle
A thermal power plant that improves efficiency with two different kinds of energy extraction from the combustion products gas stream, such as a gas turbine followed by a steam boiler.
communication system
A system intended to convey information from one place to another with an expected degree of performance.
communications satellite
A satellite in Earth orbit designed for international telephone, television, or data transmission.
commutation cell
The elementary switching device in a power converter circuit; it could be a transistor, a thyristor, a mercury-arc valve, or others.
commutator
A component of a DC electric machine that connects the rotating coils with an external circuit through brushes.
compact fluorescent lamp
A fluorescent lamp with a folded or spiral tube, designed to fit in the same space as an incandescent lamp of similar light output.
Compactron
A brand of vacuum tube, used in some radio and television sets, that combined multiple independent functions in one envelope.
compensation winding
A winding on a motor or generator to improve commutation at heavy load.
computed tomography
Production of images of a cross-section through an object by multiple X-ray measurements processed in a computer.
computer engineering
The profession of designing computers.
computer hardware
That part of a computer system with physical existence.
computer programming
The practice of producing instructions for a computer to achieve some desired effect.
computer-aided design (CAD)
A design discipline where a computer is used to produce a graphical representation of a real-world object in order to design its structure or to assist in calculating performance parameters.
conduction band
In a conductor, the energy levels of charge carriers that are free to move through the material.
constant k filter
A method formerly used for designing filters for a required characteristic.
consumer electronics
Electronic devices intended to be owned by consumers directly; a mobile cell phone is "consumer electronics" but the cell site it communicates with is not.
contactor
An automatically controlled electrical switch (relay), used to operate motors or other high-current loads.
continuous Fourier transform
A mathematical operation that expresses a signal in time as the sum of its frequency components.
continuous signal
A signal that can take any value within its range.
control engineering
The application of control theory to practical problems.
control system
The equipment used to adjust some parameter of an ongoing process to regulate its behavior to a desired goal, such as positioning a disk drive head or regulating temperature of a furnace.
control theory
The mathematical study of behavior of control systems.
controllability
In control theory, the degree to which a system can be put into any desired state given manipulation of one variable.
controller
A system that adjusts some variable to control a process.
copper cable certification
The process of testing a computer network cable installation to verify that it meets standards.
copper loss
That portion of an electric machine or transformer's loss attributed to the resistance of conductors (which are not necessarily made of copper).
corona ring
A component of a high-voltage system intended to smooth out the electric field distribution around energized parts.
coulomb
The SI unit of electric charge.
Coulomb's law
The mathematical relation between force, electric charge and distance.
CPU
Central Processing Unit, the element of a computer that carries out arithmetic and logic operations.
crest factor
The ratio of peak to effective (RMS) value of a waveform.
crossed-field amplifier
A type of microwave amplifier vacuum tube.
crosstalk
Objectionable presence of a signal from one circuit in another circuit sharing the same transmission path, such as a cable.
crystal oscillator
An electronic oscillator whose frequency is stabilized by a piezoelectric crystal resonator element.
Ćuk converter
One kind of buck-boost voltage converter that uses a capacitor as an energy storage element.
current
The movement of electric charge.
current density
The current flowing per unit area of a conductor.
current source inverter
A type of power inverter where an inductor tends to keep a constant current flowing in the inverter stage.
current source
In circuit theory, an element that produces a defined current independent of the connected circuit properties.
current transformer
An instrument transformer used for measuring current in AC power systems.
current-to-voltage converter
A transducer that produces an output voltage in response to an input current.
cybernetics
The science of automatic control systems.
cycloconverter
A type of variable-frequency power converter that does not first convert AC to DC.

== D ==
damping ratio
A parameter that indicates how rapidly oscillations in a system die out, if ever.
Darlington transistor
An interconnection of two transistors to provide a gain that is the product of the individual gains.
data compression
Any technique that allows information to be transmitted more compactly than originally expressed, for example, codes.
data networks
A network for interconnection of computers and peripherals.
DC injection braking
A method of slowing an AC electric motor by passing direct current through its windings.
DC-to-DC converter
A circuit that converts a DC voltage into a different level of DC voltage.
degaussing
The process of reducing the residual magnetic field in a metallic object, such as a ship.
delay line
A circuit component that introduces a delay in a signal.
delta-wye transformer
One type of connection of a three-phase transformer.
demand factor
The fraction of actual use of some quantity, related to the maximum that could be used in a specified time.
demand response
The ability of a generating station or grid to follow changes in load while maintaining voltage and frequency within acceptable limits.
demodulation
The process of recovery of information (sound, video, data) from a modulated carrier.
describing function
A method for analyzing non-linear control systems.
detector
A circuit that demodulates a radio signal to recover information.
DIAC
A four-layer semiconductor diode that has a predictable breakdown characteristic.
dielectric
A material that does not allow free flow of electric current.
digital audio broadcasting
Transmission of sound by digital signals over radio.
digital circuit
A circuit where all points on the signal path have only one of two states.
digital computers
A computer made of digital circuits.
digital control
A control system that processes signals in digital form.
digital filter
A filter implemented as a digital circuit.
digital image processing
Manipulation of an image by a digital computer.
digital micromirror device
An element of a kind of digital projector system.
digital protective relay
A power system protection device that processes signals in digital form.
digital signal controller
A type of microprocessor that combines a digital signal processor element with a more general purpose microcontroller.
digital signal processing
The technique of modifying the properties of a signal that has been converted to digital form.
digital television
Transmission of images using digital techniques.
digital-to-analog converter
A device that produces a voltage or current that is proportional to a digital value sent to it.
diode bridge
An interconnection of diodes to rectify alternating current to direct current.
diode
A two-terminal passive circuit element, with a preferred direction of current flow.
dipole antenna
A simple form of antenna that consists of two conductors oriented end-to-end with a feed in between them.
direct current (DC)

Electric current that flows in one direction only, in contrast to alternating current (AC), where the flow of current periodically changes direction and magnitude.
direct on line starter
A kind of motor starter that does not reduce the voltage at the motor terminals.
direct torque control
A method of estimating motor torque as part of a variable speed motor drive.
discrete cosine transform
A mathematical technique for representing a sampled signal as a sum of cosine waves of different frequencies.
discrete Fourier transform
A mathematical technique for representing a sampled signal as a sum of sine and cosine waves of different frequencies.
discrete-time signal
A signal represented as a time series of samples taken at regular intervals.
displacement current
The effect of a time-varying electric field, which induces a magnetic field just as the motion of electrical charges does.
display device
Any device that displays data from an information system, such as a watch readout or an automatic scoreboard.
dissipation
The loss of energy in a system, such as dielectric loss in a capacitor.
dissolved gas analysis
A technique for fault detection in oil-filled transformers.
distributed control system
A control system in which significant parts of the control process are decentralized.
distributed-element model
An analysis of an electric circuit where capacitance, inductance, and resistance are distributed along the circuit, as in a transmission line, not concentrated in lumped components.
distributed generation
An electrical grid where multiple small sources contribute energy, instead of relatively few large central generating stations.
distribution board
A piece of electrical switchgear which distributes electric power to multiple branch circuits.
distribution transformer
A power transformer, usually used to change the utility distribution voltage to a lower voltage for use on the customer premises.
Dolby
A trademark for a noise reduction technique for analog sound recordings.
dot convention
A system for marking terminals on instrument transformers to maintain correct polarity.
doubly fed electric machine
An electric machine where both moving and stationary elements have external connections handling significant power.
downsampling
A technique for reducing the number of signal samples processed by a digital system; decimation.
Dqo transformation
A technique used to simplify mathematical analysis of polyphase electric circuits.
droop speed control
A method of regulating generators so that multiple units share the load proportional to their ratings.
dual control theory
A branch of control theory that deals with systems whose characteristics are initially unknown.
dual loop
A method of supervising contacts and wiring in a security system, so as to detect some faults or tampering.
DVD
Digital Versatile Disc, a type of optical disc for distributing video recordings and data using an orange/red laser.
dynamic braking
A braking system that extracts energy from a moving system to bring it to rest; a dynamic braking system generally is not used to hold a position of a stationary object.
dynamic demand
A technique for load management on an electrical grid based on frequency measurement.
dynamic programming
A technique for optimization of the solution of a problem by combining solutions to smaller sub-problems.
dynamic random-access memory
A type of semiconductor memory where data is stored as electric charges on capacitors; the charges must be refreshed periodically or else they will leak away, losing the stored data.
dynamo
A direct-current generator, whose exciting field is provided by an electromagnet.

== E ==
earth-leakage circuit breaker (ELCB)
A protective device consisting of a current- or voltage-sensing mechanism that opens or "breaks" a circuit when stray current or voltage is detected, which might otherwise present the possibility of electric shock.
eddy current
An electric current induced inside a conductor exposed to a changing magnetic field.
edge detection
An image processing technique used to identify boundaries of objects.
Edison effect

The emission of an electric current from a hot electrode, the thermal energy of which gives some small charged particles such as electrons and ions enough kinetic energy to escape the material's surface. Thermionic emission is the fundamental mechanism underlying the vacuum tube.
electret
A dielectric material that quasi-permanently retains an impressed electrical polarization; the dual to a magnet.
electric arc
The discharge of electric current through an open space between conductors, either intentionally to produce a source of intense light and heat, or as the result of an electrical fault.
electric charge
The physical property of matter that causes it to experience a force when placed in an electromagnetic field.
electric circuit
A closed path through which an electric current can flow.
electric current
The motion of electric charges.
electric displacement field
In Maxwell's equations, a vector field due to electric charges.
electric distribution systems
That portion of an electrical grid that connects customers to substations or the bulk transmission system.
electric field gradient (EFG)
The rate of change of an electric field with respect to distance.
electric field
A vector field that exerts a force on electric charges.
electric generator
A machine that converts mechanical energy to electrical energy by moving conductors through magnetic fields.
electric motor
A machine that produces mechanical energy from electrical energy, by moving conductors through magnetic fields.
electric multiple unit
The use of more than one electric locomotive on a train.
electric potential
A measure of the work required to move a unit electric charge in an electric field.
electric power conversion
Generally, changing the form of electric power.
electric power distribution
In an electric grid, the network that brings power from a substation or bulk supply to individual customers.
Electric Power Research Institute
A non-profit organization that carries out research on behalf of the US electric power industry.
electric power transmission
The bulk movement of electric power for many customers from a generating plant to a local distribution network, usually at high voltage.
electric power
The rate of transfer of electrical energy past a given point.
electric shock
An injury caused to people or animals by electric current.
electrical cable
A flexible conducting wire to carry electrical power or signals, usually covered with an insulating material.
electrical code
A set of regulations for the use of electricity; they may vary from municipal to international in scope.
electrical conductivity
A measure of a substance's ability to pass an electric current.
electrical conductor
An object that carries an electric current, with little loss.
electrical contact
A separable part of an electric device that carries current when touching another contact.
electrical discharge machining (EDM)
Shaping of a workplace by small sparks.
electrical element
In circuit theory, a node at which some electrical property is concentrated (resistance, etc.).
electrical engineering
The profession of applying electricity to practical problems.
electrical equipment
Any apparatus for generation, transmission or utilization of electric power.
electrical grid
A geographically distributed system to connect sources and users of electric power.
electrical impedance
That property of a circuit that resists the passage of electric current, usually in the context of alternating current.
electrical insulation paper
A grade of paper used for insulation of transformers, electrical machines, capacitors, and some cables.
electrical insulation
A material that resists electrical current flow.
electrical load
A consumer of electrical energy, turning it into light, heat, mechanical power, data, or chemical changes.
electrical machine
Any apparatus that converts between electrical power and mechanical power, such as a motor or generator.
electrical measurements
That branch of metrology concerned with electrical quantities.
electrical network
A network of electrical components and conductors.
electrical polarity
Identification of electrical terminals where current is flowing in the same direction relative to the device.
electrical steel
Any of several types of steel used for manufacturing the magnetic field components of machines and transformers.
electrical substation
A facility connecting a distribution network to a transmission network, usually with one or more transformers.
electrical technologist
A specialist in applying electrical theory and technique to practical problems.
electrical wiring regulations
The legal framework for electrical installations in buildings.
electrical wiring
The installation of conductors, fixtures and protection devices for a structure or vehicle.
electricity meter
An instrument to measure the electrical energy used by a customer for revenue purposes.
electricity pylon
A structure, generally of wood or metal, to support wires.
electricity
The set of physical phenomena associated with electric charges.
electrification
Applying electric power to a process that was previously done by other means, or, development of an electric power system in a region that previously had none.
electroactive polymers
A polymer that significantly changes size or shape when exposed to an electric field.
electrocardiograph
A record of the electrical activity of the heart.
electrochemical engineering
The profession of application of electrochemistry to practical problems.
electrode
An electrical contact that connects some medium to an electric circuit, such as in an electrochemical cell or a vacuum tube.
electro-diesel locomotive
A railway locomotive with a diesel engine, generator, and electric driving motors that can be powered by the diesel engine or the track electrical supply.
electrodynamics
The branch of physics that studies electrical charges and electrical currents.
electrolyte
A liquid or solid medium that carries electric current in the form of ions.
electromagnet
A magnet that generates a magnetic field from an electric current.
electromagnetic compatibility
The control of unwanted electromagnetic interference.
electromagnetic field
The field produced by moving electric charges and magnetic fields.
electromagnetic induction
The production of current in a circuit by the change of magnetic field intersecting the circuit.
electromagnetic radiation
Radio waves, light and other radiation that travels through space at the speed of light.
electromagnetic spectrum
The range of frequencies of electromagnetic radiation.
electromagnetic wave equation
A second-order partial differential equation that describes the propagation of electromagnetic waves through a medium or in a vacuum.
electromagnetism
The science of electric fields, magnetic fields, currents, charges, and forces.
electromechanical
A system that has both an electrical component and a mechanical component, such as a motor or a relay.
electromote
An 1882 demonstration of a prototype electric trolley bus.
electromotive force
A difference in electrical potential between two points, such as produced by a battery or a generator.
electron microscope
An instrument that provides highly magnified images by use of an electron beam.
electronic amplifier
A device that increases the power of an electrical signal by electronic means.
electronic circuit
A circuit using one or more electronic devices.
electronic component
An active or passive element of an electronic circuit.
electronic control unit
In an automobile, an embedded electronic system that controls some aspect of a vehicle (ignition, transmission, and so on).
electronic design automation
A system in which a computer provides assistance to the designer of a device or system.
electronic engineering
The profession of applying electronics to practical problems.
electronic filter
A filter that alters some frequency-related characteristic of a signal.
electronics
The study of the flow of electrons through a vacuum, gases, or semiconductors.
electronic speed control
A device for regulating the speed of a motor.
electrophorus
An instrument used to produce electrostatic charge through electrostatic induction.
electrostatic motor
A motor that relies on the forces generated by electric fields, instead of magnetic fields.
electrostatics
The study of stationary electric charges and resulting forces.
embedded operating system
The common operating environment that supports embedded software; it may be a highly tailored version of a general-purpose operating system, or written solely for the purpose of embedded system operations.
embedded software
A firmware component of a microprocessor-controlled system.
embedded system
A computer system that controls a device or system, with no or a minimal user interface; for example, the ignition system in a car may have a microprocessor to control it.
enameled wire
Wire insulated with a thin flexible layer of enamel, used for electrical windings.
energy demand management
A system to adjust energy demand to reduce costs.
energy economics
A branch of economics concerned with energy supply and demand.
energy efficient transformer
A power transformer designed to have lower than average energy loss.
energy returned on energy invested
A measure of how long an energy producing system takes to replace the energy it took to make it.
energy subsidies
Payments to a consumer or producer of electric energy that are used as incentives for production or consumption.
engine-generator
A combination of an internal combustion engine and a generator, often used as a standby power plant.
ENIAC
The first general purpose electronic digital computer.
Epstein frame
An apparatus used for testing of magnetic materials.
equalization
1. (audio) The adjustment of the frequency response of an audio system to improve its utility.
2. (communications) The adjustment of the frequency spectrum of a communications signal to cancel out the effect of the frequency response of a communication path.
equivalent circuit
In circuit theory, a simple combination of elements that behaves at its terminals like a more complex combination.
equivalent impedance transforms
A mathematical method to determine values of an equivalent circuit.
error correction and detection
Techniques used to improve reliability of computer memory or communications channels by including extra information along with the desired data.
exponential stability
A system that settles to a steady state after a disturbance, at a rate proportional to exponential time.
extended Kalman filter
A strategy for estimating an unknown value in a non-linear system by combining multiple measurements.

== F ==
farad
The SI unit of capacitance.
Faraday shield
A solid conductive shield around a volume, which blocks electromagnetic fields.
Faraday–Lenz law
One of Maxwell's equations, describing the relation between a changing magnetic field and production of an electromotive force.
Faraday's law of induction
The relation between a changing magnetic field and the resulting voltage produced in a closed path.
fast Fourier transform
A digital algorithm to analyze a time series of sampled data into a set of sine and cosine frequency components.
fault
A short circuit, open circuit, or other disruption of a power system.
fax

The transmission of paper images by radio or by wire.
feed forward
A control system that adjusts the controlled variable based on a model of the process and measurements of disturbances, instead of feedback from measurement of the process.
feedback amplifier
An amplifier that feeds back a small sample of its output to its input, to improve linearity.
feedback
A system that samples part of its output and adds that to its input; feedback may be either positive or negative, aiding or opposing the initial input signal.
feed-in tariff
A premium rate paid to distributed generators to encourage alternative energy sources.
ferrite core
A magnetic core for an inductor made from a metal oxide compound.
ferroelectricity
The property of materials that spontaneously maintain an electrical polarization, as a ferromagnetic material maintains magnetic polarization.
fiber-optic cable
A transmission medium that uses infrared energy or light to transmit information down a long thin transparent filament such as glass.
field effect transistor
A transistor that relies on modulation of conductivity of a channel instead of injection of minority carriers as does a bipolar transistor.
field-oriented control
A control strategy for variable frequency drives that models the magnetic field of the motor to control its torque.
filter
A circuit that selectively alters a signal based on its frequency components.
filter capacitor
In a power supply, a capacitor that smooths the DC voltage produced by a rectifier stage.
finite impulse response
A class of digital filters whose response to an impulse returns to zero in finite time.
firmware
Software of a computer that is never or rarely altered during its working life, for example, the control computer program for an automotive ignition system.
Fleming valve
The first important vacuum tube device, used as a radio detector.
Fleming's left-hand rule for motors
A mnemonic to recall the relative orientation of current, magnetic field and resulting force for electric motors.
Fleming's right-hand rule for generators
A mnemonic to recall the relative orientation of current, magnetic field and resulting force for electric generators.
fluorescent lamp
A type of electric lamp that relies on a phosphor coating to produce visible light from the ultraviolet light generated by a mercury discharge.
flux linkage
In a magnetic system, that part of the magnetic flux that passes through a given closed path, which may be a winding.
flyback converter
A type of voltage converter that stores energy in an inductor.
flyback transformer
A type of transformer that recovers energy stored in its own core. Historically used in the deflection circuits of CRT display systems.
forward converter
A type of voltage converter that relies on transformer action to couple energy to its output circuit.
fossil-fuel phase-out
A plan to replace coal, oil, or natural gas fuel with other sources to produce electrical energy.
fossil-fuel power station
A power plant using coal, oil, or natural gas fuel.
Fourier series
A set of coefficients of sine and cosine waves; this can represent a time function as a function of frequency.
Fourier transform
An algorithm for converting a continuous waveform in the time domain into an equivalent set of spectral components in the frequency domain.
free-space optical communication
Transfer of information from point to point by a beam of light or infrared energy, instead of a wired connection or radio waves.
frequency changer
An electric machine used to transfer power between two networks with different frequencies, or, an electronic device (more usually called a frequency mixer) that changes the frequency of an input signal to some other frequency.
frequency modulation
A method of impressing information on a carrier wave by changing its frequency.
frequency response
The measure of the output of a system in response to an input of varying frequency.
full load current
The current drawn by a motor or other electrical machine at its full rated power and standard voltage.
full-wave rectifier
A rectifier circuit that converts both positive and negative parts of the input alternating current waveform into a unidirectional, direct current.
fuse
A circuit protective device that interrupts excessive current by melting a metal strip.
fuzzy control
A control system that relies on fuzzy logic instead of binary true/false conditions.

== G ==
gain scheduling
A technique for control of non-linear systems that use different control parameters based on some measurement of the process controlled.
galvanic corrosion
Electrochemical corrosion of one metal in contact with another.
galvanometer
An instrument for detecting small electric currents.
gamma ray
Electromagnetic radiation with wavelengths shorter than ten nanometres; strictly speaking, radiation that is produced in the nucleus of atoms.
gas-filled tube
An electron tube device that relies on the presence of gas for operation, usually at less than atmospheric pressure.
gate turn-off thyristor (GTO)
A four-layer power semiconductor device that can be turned on and off by signals at a control (gate) terminal.
Gauss's law
A mathematical relation between the electric flux passing through a surface and the charge contained within that surface.
generator
In circuit theory, an ideal voltage source or an ideal current source, whose properties are independent of the connected circuit.
governor
A speed regulator for a machine such as a steam engine; an early important feedback control cybernetic system.
grid energy storage
Any system tied to an electrical grid that stores electrical energy at low demand times and releases it to meet peak loads; it might be a centralized station like a pumped-storage hydroelectric plant, or might be distributed over many customer sites such as by the use of electric vehicle batteries.
grid-tie inverter
A power inverter that allows synchronization with the electrical grid for export of energy surplus to the facility's needs.
ground
A reference point for electrical potential; often connected to the Earth.
ground and neutral
Protective and circuit return conductors in a wiring system.
ground fault circuit interrupter (GFCI)
See residual-current device.
ground-level power supply
A system for providing powers for electric trams without overhead wires and without a permanently energized third rail.
growler
A test instrument that is used to diagnose some faults with AC motors.
GSM
The second generation of cellular mobile phone technology, deployed since 1991 in Europe.
Gunn diode
A two-terminal solid-state device that is used in microwave oscillators.
gyrotron
A high-power vacuum tube oscillator that can produce microwave frequencies up to hundreds of gigahertz at power levels up to megawatts.

== H ==
H infinity
An optimization strategy for certain classes of control problems.
Hall-effect sensor
A device that detects and measures magnetic field by the Hall-effect voltage induced in a current-carrying semiconductor.
harmonic distortion
An effect of a non-linear signal path that introduces frequencies that are integer multiples of an input frequency.
harmonic oscillator
An oscillator which produces sinusoidal output, such as a simple RLC oscillator.
harmonic
A waveform that has a frequency which is an integer multiple of another frequency.
harmonics
Distortion of the power line voltage due to non-linear loads such as rectifiers.
H-bridge
An array of four controlled switches that converts direct current to alternating current, with peak value equal to the supply voltage.
HDTV
High Definition Television, any television system with more than 625 scan lines.
headphone
An audio transducer or pair of transducers designed to be worn on or in the ear.
heat transfer
The study of the flow of heat energy; heat transfer concerns dictate major design features of most electrical and electronic systems.
heatsink
A structure intended to dissipate heat from an active device into the ambient environment.
Heaviside step function
A mathematical unit step function useful in the solution of certain differential equations by the methods of operational calculus.
Helmholtz coil
An arrangement of coils useful for producing a uniform magnetic field within a certain volume.
henry
The SI unit of inductance.
hertz (Hz)
The SI unit of frequency, equivalent to one cycle per second (1/s or s^{−1}).
heterodyne
A signal frequency created by combining or mixing signals of different frequencies in a nonlinear signal-processing device such as a vacuum tube, transistor, or diode in order to produce a new frequency. The process of creating such a frequency is called heterodyning; it is used to shift signals from one frequency to another and also as part of the processes of modulation and demodulation.
heterostructure
A semiconductor device built of two or more dissimilar materials.
Hi-Fi
High Fidelity, the set of techniques for reproduction of sounds that appear natural in source.
high-voltage cable
A flexible insulated electrical conductor designed to withstand a significant voltage; "high" voltage may be hundreds or hundreds of thousands of volts, depending on the context.
high voltage
Any voltage at which safety concerns apply. In some contexts, anything over 100 volts may be considered high voltage; in electric power transmission, high voltage usually refers to voltages greater than 66,000 volts.
high-pass filter
An electrical network that tends to pass higher frequencies and block lower ones.
high-voltage direct current
A system for power transmission that uses high DC voltages for reasons of economy or stability.
high-voltage switchgear
Electrical apparatus designed for control of high-voltage circuits.
Hilbert transform
A mathematical operation used in signal processing.
holography
The technique of recording and reconstructing the wavefront of an electromagnetic field. It is commonly used to generate three-dimensional images known as holographs by recording the interference patterns of light waves as they collide with a physical object or scene, but also has applications in data storage, microscopy, and interferometry.
home appliance
Any electrical appliance intended for use in a home.
homopolar generator
A generator in which current and magnetic field direction are constant as the machine rotor revolves.
homopolar motor
A motor that produces torque from a current and magnetic field that does not change direction.
horsepower (hp)
A unit of power equivalent to approximately 746 watts.
hot wire barretter
A current dependent resistor formed of a fine wire in an envelope, useful for regulating current.
humidistat
A switch that operates automatically on detecting a change in moisture content of the air.
HVAC
High Voltage Alternating Current; depending on context, this could be hundreds or hundreds of thousands of volts.
HVDC converter station
An element of a high-voltage direct current power transmission system in which each end of the transmission line has a converter station connected to the local AC grid.
HVDC
High Voltage Direct Current.
hybrid coil
A kind of transformer used for bidirectional transmission of signals over one pair of wires, for example, as in an analog telephone set.
hydroelectricity
The generation of electric power from the kinetic energy of falling or moving water.
hydropower
Any power (usually electric) generated by the force of moving water.
hysteresis
A characteristic of a system where its state is history-dependent.

== I ==
IGBT
Insulated Gate Bipolar Transistor, a power semiconductor device that combines some of the advantages of field-effect and bipolar transistors.
image impedance
A parameter used in the design of electrical networks such as filters.
image noise reduction
Any technique used to reduce interfering effects in processing of an image.
image processing
Electronic recording, storage, alteration, and reproduction of pictures.
impulse response
The response of a network to a sudden narrow pulse input.
incandescent light bulb
A device that uses a fine wire filament heated by an electric current to produce visible light (with heat usually produced as a byproduct).
induction coil
An early name for a transformer; or a type of transformer intended for high-voltage uses.
induction cooker
A cooking appliance that heats pots with magnetic fields by electromagnetic induction.
induction generator
A type of generator where the rotating field winding is excited by induction from the stationary armature winding.
induction motor
A type of motor where the rotating field winding is excited by induction from the stationary armature winding.
induction regulator
A type of variable transformer that provides stepless control of the output by changing the coupling between two coils.
inductive coupling
The transfer of energy between two circuits through a shared magnetic field passing through both.
inductive output tube
A high-power, high-frequency amplifier tube, in some forms capable of megawatt pulses at hundreds of megahertz.
inductor

A passive two-terminal circuit component with a concentrated inductance, usually an insulated wire wound into a coil, which stores energy in a magnetic field when an electric current flows through it.
industrial and multiphase power plugs and sockets
Electrical fittings used to connect cables to three-phase power circuits.
industrial automation
The general practice of automatic control applied to industrial operations.
infinite impulse response
A filter which, mathematically, never gets to a zero effect of an impulse at its input, though practically the response may become negligible after a definite time.
information appliance
Conceptually, an embedded computer system with a specialized user interface designed to simplify one task, such as e-mail or photos; a modern smartphone approaches this concept.
information theory
The mathematical study of information.
information
In one sense, the answers to uncertainties.
input/output (I/O)
That part of a computer system devoted to exporting and importing data, for example, in human-readable form.
inrush current
The transient current that flows when first connecting a device to a power source.
Institute of Electrical and Electronics Engineers (IEEE)
The American-based society for electrotechnology.
Institution of Engineering and Technology
The British society of electrical and electronics engineers.
instrumentation engineering
The profession dealing with development of measuring systems.
instrumentation
A device that turns some physical property into a measurement.
insulation monitoring device
A supervisory device to detect failure of electrical insulation.
insulator
A substance that does not permit easy flow of electric current; a fitting intended to support a conductor.
integrated circuit
An interconnected array of electronic devices, factory assembled on a single substrate.
intelligent control
The application of artificial intelligence techniques to process control.
intelligent transportation system
The application of information technology to manage some aspects of a transportation system.
intermittent energy source
An energy source whose availability is transient and not under human control. It may be sporadically available or available on some natural schedule not coincident with human demands. The term refers particularly to energy sources that are not dispatchable.
International Electrotechnical Commission (IEC)
An international standards organization devoted to electrical standards; most countries are members.
International Organization for Standardization
An international organization coordinating the efforts of national technical standards organizations.
interrupter
Any of a series of automatically operated electromechanical switches that periodically open and close a circuit.
inverter

Any electronic device or circuitry that converts direct current (DC) to alternating current (AC) without the use of rotating machines, instead using electron devices such as mercury arc valves or thyristors. An inverter is the opposite of a rectifier.
iron loss
That portion of the wasted power of a machine or transformer attributed to hysteresis and eddy currents in the iron core.
isolated-phase bus (IPB)

A bus where each phase is in its own grounded metal enclosure to prevent faults from spreading from phase to phase. This design is often used for circuits carrying very large currents such as hydroelectric power plants.
isolation transformer
A transformer especially intended to prevent leakage current from passing from its primary circuit to the secondary circuit.
iterative learning control
A technique for improving the accuracy of control systems that carry out the same sequence repeatedly.

== J ==
j operator
Electrical engineering uses "j" to represent the imaginary unit "i", to prevent confusion with the symbol for current. $j \times j = -1$.
Jedlik's dynamo
An early form of electric generator using electromagnets.
JFET
A field effect transistor with a reverse-biased PN junction between gate and channel.
jitter
Deviation from the true periodicity of a periodic signal.
Joule heating
Heating in a conductor due to passage of current.
joule (J)
A derived unit of energy in the International System of Units, equal to the energy transferred to (or work done on) an object when a force of one newton acts on that object in the direction of the force's motion through a distance of one metre (1 newton-metre or N⋅m). It is also the energy dissipated as heat when an electric current of one ampere passes through a resistance of one ohm for one second.

== K ==
Kalman filter
An algorithm for estimating an unknown value from a series of approximate measurements.
Kelvin–Stokes theorem
A theorem in calculus, useful in analytic solutions of problems in electromagnetism.
Kilovolt-ampere
A unit of apparent power.
Kirchhoff's circuit laws
The observation that the sum of the currents at any node of a circuit must be zero, and the sum of the voltage differences around any loop must be zero; often abbreviated "KCL" and "KVL" in lecture notes.
klystron
A type of microwave oscillator vacuum tube.

== L ==
ladder network
A string of many, often equally dimensioned, impedances connected between two reference voltages.
LAN
Local Area Network, an interconnection of computers over a building or small campus.
Laplace transform
A mathematical operation for solution of differential equations by transforming them to the s domain from the time domain.
laser diode
A semiconductor device that produces coherent laser radiation when properly energized.
leakage inductance
The inductance of a transformer that results from magnetic flux not linked by both primary and secondary windings.
light-emitting diode (LED)
A semiconductor device that produces visible, infrared, or ultraviolet light radiation when properly energized.
linear alternator
An electrical machine that generates electric power from the relative straight-line motion of its parts.
linear motor
An electrical machine that generates electric force in a straight line by the interaction of its moving parts and magnetic fields.
linear variable differential transformer
A transducer that produces an electrical signal proportional to the movement between its parts.
lineman
A specialist technician who installs outdoor plant wiring such as overhead circuits and power transmission lines.
Litz wire
A kind of stranded wire used to minimize losses in coils.
load flow study
A mathematical prediction of the flow of electric power in a network, based on a model of the actual or proposed system; necessary for planning of electrical grids.
load following power plant
A power plant that can economically be operated over a significant range of output, so as to meet varying electric power demand.
load-loss factor
A factor for estimating energy lost in a distribution network due to load current.
load management
Any strategy for altering the operation of customer loads so as to reduce peak demand on an electrical grid.
load profile
The daily, weekly, or annual plot of electrical load against time.
local positioning system
A navigation system that does not cover the whole Earth but rather a particular subregion or locality, which may range in size from an entire continent to a single building.
LORAN
A radio navigation system developed from a World War II military system (GEE) and used for civilian purposes until the 1980s.
Lorentz force law
The mathematical relation between currents in conductors and the resulting magnetic forces between them.
lossless data compression
Any data compression method where the source can be reconstructed exactly; where approximations are tolerable, lossy data compression can be used.
lossy data compression
Any data compression method which allows only a close approximation of the source to be reconstructed; useful for images or music, where the human perceptual system compensates for errors or missing information.
loudspeaker
An electroacoustic transducer that converts electrical current into sound with amplification that makes it perceptible to more than one listener.
low-noise amplifier
In a satellite radio receiving system, an amplifier placed near the antenna.
low-noise block downconverter
In a satellite radio receiving system, a device that amplifies and converts signals to a lower frequency band that will have lower losses in interconnecting cables.
low-pass filter
An electric filter network that passes lower frequencies and blocks higher ones.
LTI system theory
The theory of systems that, over a useful range, respond proportionally to inputs and don't change characteristics while responding.
lumen
The SI unit of luminous flux, the energy of visible light.
lumped parameters
A set of parameters which describe an electrical network where the circuit elements are small compared to the wavelengths of the signals passing through it.
Lyapunov stability
A criterion for stability of a dynamical system. If disturbances from a stable point decrease and the system returns to that stable point, it can be said to be Lyapunov-stable.

== M ==
machine learning
The set of artificial intelligence techniques for systems that can follow examples to solve new problems.
magnet wire
The class of wire manufactured for winding electromagnetic coils such as in motors or transformers.
magnetic blowout
A component of a switching device that uses a magnetic field to assist in extinguishing the arc, using a permanent magnet or a coil.
magnetic circuit
A path through which magnetic flux passes.
magnetic constant
The constant that relates the strength of magnetic flux to magnetic induction in free space.
magnetic core memory
A type of computer memory that stores data as magnetization in tiny rings of ferrite material.
magnetic field
A field that causes magnets and currents to experience forces.
magnetic flux density
The amount of magnetic field per unit area; in SI units, measured in webers per square metre.
magnetic flux
The magnetic field; a conductor that encloses a changing magnetic flux will have a voltage induced in it.
magnetic moment
The proportionality constant that relates the twisting torque produced on an object to the magnetic field.
magnetism
The class of natural phenomena related to magnets and magnetic fields.
magnetization
A property of a material that measures its response to a magnetic field.
magnetization current
In a transformer, that portion of the current used to support magnetic flux.
magnetostatics
The study of stationary magnetic fields.
magnetostriction
A property of some materials that change shape when subject to a magnetic field.
magnifying transmitter
A concept for a signal transmitter that used a resonant transformer to provide a high voltage.
main distribution frame
In a telephone central office, the equipment that connects to subscriber circuits.
mainframe computer
A large centralized computer system, used for large volumes of data or supporting multiple interactive terminals, with large input/output capacity, generally expected to provide critical services to a business or institution with a predictable degree of reliability.
mains electricity
Commercial electric power, purchased from an off-site source shared by many consumers. Regional supplies vary in voltage, frequency, and technical standards.
mains hum
Interference on an audio or visual signal related to the power line frequency.
marginal stability
Said of a system that neither returns to its initial state when disturbed nor diverges to some unstable condition.
marine energy
Any technique for extracting useful energy from tides, waves, or salinity or temperature gradients of the ocean.
Marx generator
A kind of circuit for generating very high DC voltage pulses.
Maser
A device that produces microwave energy in a similar manner to a LASER.
maximum prospective short-circuit current
The calculated value of current that could flow if a short circuit occurred; a parameter for selection of circuit protection devices.
Maxwell's equations
The fundamental relations between electric and magnetic fields, expressed in concise mathematical form.
mechanical rectifier
An electromechanical device for converting alternating current to direct current, using sets of contacts which operate in synchronism with the AC.
mechatronics
Combinations of mechanical systems with electronics for sensing and control.
memristor
A hypothetical non-linear passive two-terminal electrical component relating electric charge and magnetic flux linkage.
mercury-arc rectifier
A mercury-arc valve; a vacuum tube device that converts alternating current to direct current by an arc in mercury vapor; displaced by solid-state devices, but formerly much used especially in high-voltage direct current transmission.
mercury vapor lamp
A lamp that generates light from a discharge struck in mercury vapor; formerly widely used in outdoor lighting, now replaced by lamps with better efficacy.
mesh analysis
A strategy for solution of the voltage distribution in some types of electrical networks.
mesh networking
A topology where infrastructure nodes connect to other nodes such as to convey information.
Metadyne
A DC electric machine with crossed fields and two sets of brushes, used as an amplifier or rotary DC transformer.
metal rectifier
A rectifier made from copper oxide or selenium; formerly widely used before development of silicon rectifiers.
micro combined heat and power
Equipment that generates process or space heat and electric power, of a size useful for a single building.
microcontroller
A microprocessor integrated with memory and input/output circuits, useful for embedded control.
microelectromechanical systems
An electromechanical system of microscopic size; they may be sensors or actuators.
microelectronics
That part of the field of electronics dealing with integrated circuits.
microgeneration
Small-scale electric power production, to provide the needs of a small building or individual consumer.
microphone
A transducer that changes sound into electrical signals.
microprocessor
A computer with its logical, arithmetic and control functions implemented on one or a few integrated circuits.
microstrip
A planar transmission line that is fabricated by printed circuit board technology and is used for microwave-frequency signals.
microstrip antenna
A planar antenna that is fabricated by printed circuit board technology.
microwave oven
A heating appliance that uses microwave energy.
microwave radio
The subset of radio technique using wavelengths that are in the range of 3 GHz or higher.
microwave
Part of the radio spectrum with wavelengths shorter than 10 centimetres.
Millman's theorem
A theorem stating the relation between branch currents and voltages for multiple sources in parallel.
mineral-insulated copper-clad cable
Cable with an outer metal cover and insulated by powdered inorganic material, suitable for high temperature; one kind of fire-resistant cable.
mobile phone
A handset that connects to the public switched telephone network by radio.
Modbus
A brand name for a serial protocol for industrial control equipment communication.
model predictive control
A control strategy for process systems based on a mathematical model of the process and its disturbances.
modem
Modulator-Demodulator, an interface between a computer system and a telephone network.
modulation transformer
Part of a radio transmitter used to impress modulation on one amplifying stage.
modulation
The impression of information on a carrier wave for transmission.
monolithic microwave integrated circuit
An integrated circuit that operates in microwave frequencies and that can be fabricated by printed circuit board technology.
monoscope
A raster scan video device that generates a single fixed image for test or identification purposes.
Moore's law
The observation that the number of transistors possible in an integrated circuit doubles approximately every two years.
Morse code
A method of transmitting text by long and short impulses and varying delays between them.
MOSFET
Metal Oxide Semiconductor Field Effect Transistor, a class of transistor using a single type of charge carrier and with a very thin insulating layer between current channel and control gate. If you count those built into integrated circuits, nearly all transistors are MOSFETs.
motion control
That part of automation that deals with accurately controlling the movements of machines.
motor controller
Electrical apparatus that regulates and protects an electric motor, which may be as simple as an on-off switch or a servo system for precision machine tools.
motor soft starter
A device that reduces the inrush current when an electric motor is first connected to the power supply.
MP3
A standard for encoding audio in digital form.
MRI
Magnetic Resonance Imaging, a technique for examining the interiors of, for example, medical patients, using sensitive measurements of the magnetic fields of atomic nuclei.
multics
An influential early time-sharing computer operating system, first released in 1969.
multimeter
A test instrument that can measure current, voltage, or resistance (though not concurrently).
Multisim
A brand of computer software for electronic circuit simulation.

== N ==
nameplate capacity
The design power output of a generator, at specified temperature rise.
nanoinverter
Grid tied inverters rated less than 100 watts, useful for connection of single solar PV panels to a building AC power system.
nanotechnology
Technology that uses devices whose principal dimensions are of the order of a few nanometres.
National Electrical Code
The United States national technical standard for building wiring installation.
National Electrical Manufacturers Association (NEMA)
A US trade association for electrical manufacturers that also develops technical standards.
negative feedback
Feedback from a control system output that tends to oppose the input.
negative resistance
A voltage/current characteristic where increasing current leads to decreased voltage drop across the device.
negawatt power
In power grid demand management, that portion of load that can be met by conservation efforts or improved energy efficiency.
neon sign
Strictly, a sign that glows orange because of a discharge through neon gas; less pedantically, any gas discharge tube formed into a sign.
neon-sign transformer
A high-voltage transformer with features intended to support operation of a neon sign.
net metering
A metering plan that allows grid customers with their own generation to be billed only for their net import of energy from the grid.
network analyzer
An analog computer system for modelling power grids; displaced now by digital computers.
network cable
Cables intended for use in data interconnections, with defined performance parameters.
network protector
A type of circuit breaker used to isolate a fault from a multi-transformer supply network.
neural network
An artificial neural network, or one of the biological neural networks that the artificial networks are inspired by.
nodal analysis
A technique for analysis of currents in an electrical network.
node
A defined point in an electrical network, with some potential relative to a reference node and where currents can be summed.
noise cancelling
A type of microphone that preferentially picks up a nearby sound source and rejects ambient noise.
noise reduction
The techniques used to reduce the perception of noise in a communications path.
noisy-channel coding theorem
A theorem that establishes the limits of the error-free data transmission in a noisy communication channel
nominal impedance
The rated impedance of an element of a circuit.
nonlinear control
The class of control problems relating to the control of systems that are nonlinear.
nonode
Any electron device (although practically, only vacuum tubes) with nine internal active electrodes controlling electron flow.
Norton's theorem
A theorem which states that any network of current sources, voltage sources, and resistors can be simplified to an equivalent network with only a current source and shunt admittance; the dual of Thevenin's theorem.
notch filter
A filter with a narrow reject band, used to block, for example, a pilot tone out of a communications network.
NTSC
The US National Television Systems Committee, that developed the analog monochrome and color television standards used for more than 60 years for broadcasting.
nuclear power
Production of electric power (or propulsion power) by nuclear fission or fusion.
numerical control
Digital automatic control, especially of machine tools.
Nuvistor
A type of miniature vacuum tube, developed around the same time transistors became common in consumer electronics.
Nyquist frequency
The maximum frequency that a sampling system can represent accurately.
Nyquist stability criterion
A graphical technique for evaluating stability of a feedback system.
Nyquist–Shannon sampling theorem
A theorem that establishes the necessary rate to accurately sample a band-limited signal.

== O ==
observability
In control theory, a measure of how well the internal state of a system corresponds to its measurable outputs.
Oersted
The CGS unit of magnetic field H.
ohm
The SI unit of electrical resistance.
ohmmeter
An instrument that measures electrical resistance.
Ohm's law
The mathematical relationship between voltage, current, and resistance.
one-line diagram
A simplified schematic diagram of a power system.
on-premises wiring
Telecommunications wiring owned by the customer.
open-circuit test
A test, of a transformer or other device, with no load connected.
open-circuit voltage
The voltage developed at the terminals of a device with no load connected.
open-circuit time constant method
A method for approximately evaluating the transfer function of an electrical network.
operational amplifier
A type of amplifier with differential inputs, widely used in circuits where feedback determines the circuit properties.
optical fiber
A glass or plastic fiber used to convey signals transmitted by visible light or infrared radiation.
optimal control
The branch of control theory studying optimization of a control system to fit some optimization criterion.
oscillation
A periodic cyclical motion or disturbance.
oscilloscope
An instrument for graphically displaying a waveform as a function of time.
Oudin coil
An early form of high-voltage induction coil identical in principle to a Tesla coil except for being constructed essentially as an auto-transformer.
out of phase
The condition when AC generation sources are not synchronized.
overhead line
Outside plant run on poles or other structures; power transmission or telecommunication wires.
oversampling
Sampling a signal at a rate higher than required by the Nyquist criterion.
overshoot
A transient excursion of a signal beyond its stead state value.
overvoltage
Application of more than rated voltage to a device.
oxygen-free copper
A grade of copper preferred for electrical applications for its low electrical resistance.

== P ==
padmount transformer
A kind of metal enclosed distribution transformer suitable for mounting on grade.
pantograph
A linkage that supports the current collector of an electric locomotive.
paraformer
A device similar to a transformer that couples energy between two circuits by varying magnetic parameters.
parameter estimation
In estimation theory, the practice of assigning values to a process model so it accurately predicts the process's behavior.
Park transform
A mathematical technique useful in the analysis of three-phase systems.
partial discharge
Breakdown of insulating gas or solid material by an electric field, but without formation of an arc.
passivity
Incapable of adding energy to a signal or process.
patch cables
Short cables with connectors, used to make connections between outlets of a patch panel or for temporary connections to a system under test.
peak demand
The maximum rate at which energy is consumed from an electrical grid; may be either an instantaneous measure or the maximum energy transferred in some interval such as 15 minutes.
Peltier–Seebeck effect
The thermoelectric effect, movement of heat due to electric current flow.
pentagrid converter
A type of self-oscillating vacuum tube used a frequency mixer in superheterodyne receivers.
pentode
Any five-electrode electron device, but usually a kind of vacuum tube.
permanent magnet synchronous generator
An AC generator that uses a permanent field magnet instead of an electromagnet.
permanent magnet
A magnet that retains its polarization after an external field is removed.
permeability
The amount of magnetisation in a material resulting from an applied magnetic field.
phase converter
Any electrical apparatus that converts power from one system of phases to another system, e.g. the conversion of single-phase power to three-phase.
phase-fired controllers
An AC power controller that adjusts the effective value of output by switching on at a variable time phase in the AC cycle.
phase locked loop
An oscillator circuit that produces an output signal that is in a fixed timing relation to a reference input.
phase modulation
Impressing information on a carrier wave by advancing or delaying the waveform slightly; related to frequency modulation.
phasor
A vector representing a signal of a given frequency in phase space.
phasor measurement unit
A system that measures the timing and amplitude of voltages and currents on an electrical grid, synchronized over a wide geographic area; the resulting measurements can be used to manage power flow on the grid.
phonograph
A record player, a device that converts the mechanical movements of a stylus in a disk or cylinder recording groove into sound.
photocell
A light sensor that produces or alters a voltage when light is present.
photodetector
Any device that detects visible light.
photodiode
A two-terminal device whose terminal voltage or current changes in response to light.
photometer
An instrument that measures light.
photonics
The technology of conveying information through light or infrared radiation.
photoresistor
A resistor whose resistance varies when light strikes it.
phototransistor
A transistor sensitive to light.
PID controller
A process control system that has proportional, integral and derivative terms in its response to errors between measured value and setpoint.
piezoelectric effect
Production of a voltage in response to mechanical pressure or mechanical deformation.
piezoelectric motor
A type of motor that uses piezoelectric elements to generate force.
PIN diode
A multilayer semiconductor diode with a thin region of intrinsic material between its p-doped and n-doped regions.
planar graph
In network theory, a set of nodes and interconnecting lines that can be given in one plane without crossing lines.
plasma
A state of matter where electric charges are free to move.
plenum cable
A fire-resistant data communications cable that is permitted to be installed in the air handling spaces of a modern building.
plug-in hybrid
A hybrid electric vehicle that can be recharged from grid power as well as its own engine/generator.
P-N junction
The boundary between two differently doped regions of a semiconductor.
polarization density
A measure of the increase of the intensity of an electric field over that in free space, owing to the separation of atomic-scale electric dipoles.
polyphase coil
A coil intended for connection to a polyphase power supply.
polyphase system
An alternating current power transmission system using three or more wires, each of which carries a current that is displaced in time with respect to the others.
Pontryagin's minimum principle
A mathematical principle used in the theory of optimal control.
port
Any place at which energy can be observed to enter or leave a system.
positive feedback
Feedback from the output of a system that tends to increase the effect of any input; if overdone, leads to instability.
potential difference
A voltage difference, the amount of work required to bring a test charge from one point to another divided by charge magnitude.
potentiometer
A three-terminal variable resistor, which can be configured as an adjustable voltage divider.
power BJT
A bipolar junction transistor that can be used in circuits handling a watt or more of power.
power cable
A flexible, insulated electrical conduit used to conduct and transmit electric power.
power conditioner
Any system intended to alter some property of the bulk power supply to improve it for some application; such as filters, surge suppressors, voltage regulators, uninterruptible power supplies, and many others.
power consumption
The rate at which a device consumes energy.
power converter
Any apparatus intended to convert electric power from one form to another, e.g. by converting between alternating current (AC) and direct current (DC) with an inverter or rectifier, or by changing frequency or phase number.
power electronics
The class of electronic devices handling power greater than one watt.
power engineering
That part of electrical engineering that deals with the generation, distribution and consumption of electrical power.
power-factor correction
Apparatus intended to bring the power factor of some load closer to 1.
power factor
The ratio of apparent power flowing to a load divided by the real power.
power-flow study
A load flow study; mathematical prediction of the magnitudes and direction of power flow in an existing or planned power grid; an essential part of grid management.
power generation
The practice of converting other energy sources to electric power.
power grid
An interconnected network of generators, transmission lines, and apparatus for reliable and economic transmission and utilization of electric power.
power inverter
See inverter.
power-line communication
The impression of carrier waves on a power line circuit for signalling purposes.
power MOSFET
A metal oxide semiconductor field effect transistor suitable for use in circuits handling more than a watt of power.
power plant
A facility that converts other energy forms into electric power.
power rating
The nominal power that an apparatus or machine can handle, with specified or customary temperature rise and life expectancy.
power quality
Conformance of an electrical power supply with its specifications.
power storage
A facility that changes electric power into some form that can be stored and usefully reconverted back to electric power, for example, pumped storage or battery systems.
power supply
A subsystem of a computer or other electronic device that turns electric power from a wall plug or batteries into a form suitable for use by the system.
power-system automation
The implementation of power-operated switching and control that allows automatic operation of power system elements, instead of manual operation.
power-system protection
The technology of limiting the spread of failures of a power system to a minimum, and of preventing permanent damage to apparatus or conductors by such faults.
printed circuit board
An etched wiring assembly for interconnection of electronic components.
printer
A device that makes permanent human readable images and text from computer data.
process control
The field of study of automatic control of processes.
programmable logic controller
A computer system designed to be rugged enough for industrial use and with a programming environment highly tuned to the domain of industrial control problems.
programming language
A formalism for human-readable instructions to a computer.
protective relay
An electromechanical or electronic device that detects faults on a power system and can signal circuit breakers to operate.
proximity effect
The increase in circuit resistance when the magnetic fields of multiple AC currents interact.
pulse transformer
A transformer designed to create or transmit pulses.
pulse-width modulation
Transmission of information by varying the duration of pulses, or, varying the average output voltage of a power converter by varying the duration of pulses.
pulse-amplitude modulation (PAM)
Transmission of information by varying the magnitude of a stream of pulses of fixed frequency.
pulse-code modulation
Any system for conveying analog information by altering some property of a stream of pulses.
pumped-storage hydroelectricity
A grid energy storage system that pumps water uphill for later use by a hydroelectric generator plant.
push switch
A device that closes or opens an electrical circuit when pushed.
push–pull converter
A converter with two sets of primary switching elements so that the transformer primary voltage can be reversed on each cycle.

== Q ==
quadrature booster
A phase shifting transformer that can inject voltages that are time delayed with respect to the input voltage.
quality factor
In a resonant circuit, the ratio of stored energy to energy dissipated on each cycle of oscillation.
quantization
Analog to digital conversion, changing a continuously varying analog signal to discrete digital numbers.

== R ==
radar cross section
The effective reflecting area of a radar target, which varies with frequency, geometry, and surface composition.
radar
Radio Detection and Ranging, the techniques for observing the speed and position of objects by reflected radio waves.
radio frequency
Electromagnetic waves with frequencies less than that of infrared radiation; commercially important radio frequencies range from tens of kilohertz up to around a terahertz.
radio transmitter
Apparatus designed to generate radio frequency electric current, which, connected to an antenna, can radiate energy through space.
radio
The technology of radio frequency devices.
railway electrification system
A set of standardized methods for applying electric power in railway traction.
Rankine cycle
A thermodynamic cycle, an idealized version of the operation cycle of a steam turbine.
reactive power
That component of apparent power flow due to the return to the source of energy stored in a load's electric or magnetic fields, that does no useful work at the load.
real-time operating system
A computer operating system that ensures responses with a bounded time to events such as in a controlled process.
receiver
The apparatus that takes radio-frequency currents induced in an antenna and turns them into useful signals.
rechargeable battery
A secondary battery; a battery that can have a useful portion of its capacity restored by connection to a supply of electric current.
reciprocity (electrical networks)
A theorem that states that the current injected into one point in a network will produce a voltage at a second point that is identical to the voltage produced at the first point by injection of the same current at the first point
reciprocity (electromagnetism)
An observation that electric currents and electric fields can be analyzed from either point of view as regards the source of the energy in the system; for example, in radio, a good transmitting antenna is generally also a good receiving antenna.
record player
A phonograph; a device that turns the variations in a disk or cylinder recording groove into sound.
rectifier
A device that converts alternating current (which periodically reverses) to direct current that flows in only one direction; may be a solid-state, vacuum tube or electromechanical device.
rectiformer
A combination of a transformer and a rectifier, used in electrochemical processes or supply of electrostatic precipitators.
recursive least squares filter
An algorithm for a digital filter system.
Reed switch
An electrical switch made of two thin strips of ferromagnetic metal, which touch when subject to a magnetic field.
regenerative braking
A braking scheme that returns energy to the source.
regenerative circuit
A circuit that employs positive feedback; can be an amplifier or an oscillator.
relaxation oscillator
An oscillator that relies on an active device periodically changing state; such oscillators usually produce a square-wave or sawtooth waveform, different from the approximately sinusoidal waveshape of a harmonic oscillator.
relay
An electrically operated switch.
reluctance motor
A type of electric motor that induces non-permanent magnetic poles on the ferromagnetic rotor, relying on varying magnetic reluctance; the rotor carries no windings.
remanence
That portion of the applied magnetic field that the material retains when the external field is removed.
remote racking system
A system for inserting circuit breakers into switchgear that allows the operator to stay at a safe distance from any possible arc hazard.
remote sensing
Acquisition of measurements of an object without contact, for example, measuring soil moisture by radar from an aircraft.
renewable electricity
Electric power derived from primary energy sources that replenish on a rapid scale or that are not appreciably diminished by human exploitation.
renewable energy payments
Any incentive program to improve the economic return of a renewable energy project.
renewable energy policy
Government plans to displace fossil fuels with renewable sources.
repeating coil
An old name for a transformer, especially one used in telephone circuits.
repowering
Refurbishing the equipment of a power plant, with a view to improved efficiency or life span.
repulsion motor
A wound rotor induction motor using a pair of short-circuited brushes on a commutator.
resettable fuse
A circuit protective device that opens on excess current, and then, on cooling off, restores the circuit automatically.
residual-current device (RCD)

A type of Earth-leakage circuit breaker designed to interrupt an electrical circuit when the currents passing through line and neutral conductors are not equal, which indicates that some amount of current is leaking to ground or to another unintended path that is not part of the circuit. By detecting this imbalance of phase currents and automatically interrupting the circuit, these devices function as protective systems to reduce the severity of injury caused by an electric shock.
resistive circuit
A circuit containing resistive elements only, no capacitors or inductors.
resistivity
The property of a material that impedes current flow.
resistor
A circuit component that primarily has resistance.
resolver
A transformer-like rotary transducer that measures rotation as an analog value.
resonant cavity
An opening that when excited by an electron stream or other means, oscillates at a particular frequency.
resonant inductive coupling
A form of energy transfer between two physically close tuned circuits.
return loss
A measure of the power loss due to a signal reflection by a discontinuity in a transmission line or an optical fiber.
RF connector
An electrical fitting used to connect cables carrying radio frequency currents.
RF engineering
The profession that deals with application of radio frequency energy to useful ends.
rheoscope
Obsolete name for an ammeter; now an instrument for measuring fluid viscosity.
rheostat
Obsolete name for a two terminal variable resistor, usually with a rotating shaft to allow manual or motor driven adjustment.
right-hand rule
A mnemonic device for remembering the definitions of the directions of current and magnetic field in generators.
ripple
A periodic variation in the amplitude of a DC signal, such as can be found in a power supply with partly effective filtering.
RLC circuit
A circuit that has only resistors, inductors, and capacitors in it.
robotics
The field of automation that deals with manipulators, especially those that mimic human appendages.
robust control
A static control algorithm that can produce acceptable performance over an anticipated useful range of process disturbances.
Rogowski coil
A current sensing coil that produces a voltage proportional to the rate of change of current; by integration, this can be turned into a measure of current.
root locus
A graphical method for analyzing the properties of a transfer function as some parameter is varied.
root mean square
The root mean square value of a waveform is the DC value that corresponds to equivalent heating value.
rotary converter
An electric machine that converts electric power between two forms, say, AC and DC or single-phase and three phase, or between two different frequencies of AC (the latter two can be performed by the same machine).
rotary encoder
A transducer that converts rotation of a shaft to a measurement.
rotary switch
A switch operated manually or electrically with a rotary motion of the contacts.
rotary transformer
A transformer used to couple electric signals or power between rotating parts.
rotary variable differential transformer
A transformer-like transducer that measures rotation as an analog value.
rotor
That part of an electrical machine that rotates. Not necessarily the armature.
Routh–Hurwitz stability criterion
A criterion for predicting the stability of a system with a given transfer function.

== S ==
Sallen–Key filter
A family of active filters with a second-order characteristic, first described in 1955.
sample and hold
A circuit that takes a sample of a changing analog value and holds onto it until the value can be processed by some other stage.
sampling
The process of taking a continually varying signal and turning it into a stream of numbers taken at regular intervals.
sampling frequency
The rate at which an analog value is sampled.
satellite
A natural or artificial object that circles another, bound only by gravity.
satellite radio
A radio broadcasting service using signals from an Earth satellite to customer receivers.
saturation
That point in the magnetization of a substance where most magnetic domains are aligned with the external field; further increase of the magnetizing force (H) gives only small increase in the magnetization (B).
SCADA
Supervisory Control and Data Acquisition, management of geographically distributed automation systems such as for an electrical grid.
scattering parameters
A matrix that describes the electrical behavior of linear electrical networks, most prominently the distributed microwave systems.
Schmitt trigger
A circuit that behaves like a snap-action switch, suddenly changing state as an analog signal increases; displays hysteresis.
Schottky diode
A diode that relies on the junction between a semiconductor and a metal.
Scott-T transformer
A transformer connection for balanced interconnection of a two-phase system and a three-phase system.
s-domain
A Laplace transform converts a function from the time domain to the "complex frequency" s-domain; making certain mathematical operations much simpler to evaluate.
SDTV
"Standard definition television" – what descriptions of HDTV call any system with 625 scan lines or less.
segmentation
A step in digital image processing that groups picture elements of an image that notionally represent some physically significant property of the imaged objects.
selenium rectifiers
One type of metal rectifier, though selenium is considered a "metalloid" – formerly much used but now replaced by silicon semiconductors.
semiconductor
A substance with electrical conductivity between that of insulators and conductors; displays a negative temperature coefficient of resistance, and is also sensitive to light. The conductivity of semiconductors can readily be altered by trace amounts of other substances, leading to devices that are the foundation of nearly all modern electronics.
semiconductor device
A device that relies on substances with electrical conductivity between that of insulators and conductors; the controllable conductivity of these materials makes most of modern electronics possible.
semiconductor fabrication
The process of turning the raw source of silicon into transistors and integrated circuits.
sensor
A device or system that converts some physical event into an electronic signal, for further use in measurement or control.
serial communication
Transmission of data as a single series of bits over a communication path.
series and parallel circuits
Electrical circuits where current passes through multiple elements either one after the other, or side by side, like the rungs of a ladder, or both.
shaded-pole motor
An alternating current single-phase motor that produces a rotating magnetic field by a turn of wire around part of a field pole.
shaft voltage
An objectionable stray voltage that appears on the rotating part of an electrical machine; very deleterious to supporting bearings.
shielded twisted pair
Two wires, wrapped around each other and covered with a flexible shield conductor; intended to reject external interference.
short-circuit test
A test of machines or apparatus where the load terminals are directly connected; usually done at reduced power to prevent damage, but destructive short circuit testing may be carried out on circuit protective devices.
short circuit
A path in a circuit that has negligible resistance; often un-intended, a fault.
shunt
A small value resistor connected around a metering element to carry most of the current; only a small part passes through the meter.
siemens
A reciprocal ohm, the SI unit of conductance. The former Siemens mercury unit was a unit of resistance.
signal
Some intentional modification of a physical communication path that is intended to convey information from one place to another.
signal processing
The technology to extract information from signals.
signal strength
A measure of the usable power of a physical signal.
signal-flow graph
A formal mathematical treatment of the representation of signal flow through a system, such as an analog computer or a radio receiver.
signal-to-noise ratio
A measure of the power contained in the useful part of the signal, to the power contained in noise. Often measured in decibels; for example, in sound reproduction a 40 or 50 decibel signal to noise ratio would be broadcast quality, whereas a 10 decibel ratio would represent very difficult operating conditions for a voice radio system.
silicon controlled rectifier
A four layer semiconductor switching device that can stand off an applied voltage until triggered by an electrical pulse on a control lead.
Silicon Valley
Initially, a region of California known for a large number of electronics technology firms.
sine wave
The waveform of the mathematical sine function; a fundamental wave shape, free of harmonics.
single-phase electric power
An alternating current power system using only two wires, where peak voltages in each wire occur at the same time.
single-sideband modulation
A radio carrier modulation system where redundant frequencies of one duplicate side band are filtered out along with the carrier, to save transmitter power.
skin effect
The tendency of alternating current to flow at the periphery of a conductor; significant for large conductors at power frequencies, and increasingly significant as the frequency increases.
sliding mode control
A control strategy for a nonlinear system that uses discontinuous control signals.
slip ring
A sliding continuous electrical contact between a machine's rotating parts and the fixed external circuit.
small-signal model
An analytical tool for systems that show significant non-linearity for large signal excursions.
smart grid
The application of information technology to improve performance of the electrical grid.
Smith chart
A graphical tool for display of the impedance of devices at varying frequencies, and for solution of problems of impedance matching in radio frequency design.
software engineering
The profession of designing software systems to meet specified performance requirements.
software
The set of instructions and data that direct a computer system.
solar cell
A photovoltaic device that converts light energy, usually from sunlight, directly into electrical energy.
solar energy
Useful energy extracted by some means from sunlight.
solar micro-inverter
An inverter suitable for use with a single solar panel.
soldering
The process of joining metals using a low melting point filler metal; a critical process in the assembly of most electronic devices.
solenoid
A coil of wire used to create a magnetic field; often a device with a ferromagnetic plunger that moves when the coil is energized.
solid state
Electronics that relies on current flow through crystalline lattices.
solid state physics
That branch of physics that studies arrangements of atoms in fixed arrays.
sound recording
The technology of recording sound for later reproduction.
space vector modulation
A control strategy for variable frequency motor drives.
spark spread
The difference between the revenue from selling a unit of electricity and the cost of the fuel used to make it.
spark-gap transmitter
A former type of radio transmitter that generated radio frequency current by exciting resonance of a tuned system with an electric spark, used almost entirely for transmission of Morse code.
spectrum analyzer
An instrument that graphically displays the amplitude of signals in a narrow bandwidth across a frequency band.
speech processing
The techniques for improving the intelligibility of human speech in a communications system.
SPICE
A set of computer programs for modelling the behavior of electronic circuits.
split phase distribution
A type of distribution system that uses a center tapped transformer to provide two voltages to a building wiring system.
split phase motor
A type of single phase motor that uses a resistor, inductor, or capacitor and two windings to obtain a rotating magnetic field.
square wave
A waveform that spends equal times at the positive and negative peak values with rapid transitions between them.
stability theory
The systematic study of control systems that deals with their response to disturbances.
stable polynomial
That class of polynomials representing the transfer functions of stable control systems.
stacking factor
A measure of the efficiency of filling the space of a machine core or winding; the proportion of active material in any given unit cross section.
standing wave ratio
A measure of impedance mismatch for transmission lines in microwave engineering; the ratio of peak amplitude of a standing wave to its minimum.
star-mesh transform
A mathematical technique used in circuit analysis.
state observer
In control theory, that which discovers and reports the internal state of a controlled system.
state space representation
A mathematical technique to represent the internal state of a controlled system as a vector in a Euclidean space.
static VAR compensator
A system that adjusts reactive power flow without moving parts, such as an electronically controlled capacitor bank.
stator
That part of a rotating electrical machine that remains stationary.
steady-state
The condition of a control system where changes due to some disturbance are no longer occurring at a significant rate.
steam turbine
A rotating machine that converts the energy of expanding steam to mechanical power through its interactions with sets of moving and stationary blades.
step response
The behavior of a control system in response to an abrupt change of input.
stepper motor
An electric motor that moves its shafts in discrete steps as different poles are energized.
stereophonic sound
Sound reproduction systems intended to reproduce sound emanating from more than one direction.
Stokes' theorem
A theorem about integration of three-dimensional functions, much used in analysis of electric fields.
storage tube
A type of cathode ray tube, used for storing images or data.
stray capacitance
A property of every conductor, when considered as a non-ideality.
structured cabling
A system for design of the telephone and data communications cable systems of a building.
submarine communications cable
A telephone or telegraph cable that is substantially under water.
sulfur hexafluoride circuit breaker
A kind of automatic circuit protection switch that breaks current in an atmosphere of pressurized sulfur hexafluoride gas to extinguish the arc.
super grid
A wide area power transmission network that allows interchange over continental distances.
supercomputer
A computer with a substantially higher level of performance than a general-purpose machine; especially adapted for high intensity calculation on large data sets.
superconducting electric machine
An experimental type of generator or motor that has part of its electric circuits in the superconducting state.
superconductivity
The loss of all electrical resistance at inconveniently low temperatures.
superheterodyne receiver
A radio receiver that changes incoming frequencies to a fixed intermediate frequency for processing.
superposition theorem
The useful property of a system where the response to the sum is the sum of the responses.
surge arrester
A device intended to absorb brief transient overvoltages to protect machines or apparatus.
surge protection
The measures taken to protect machines and apparatus from transient overvoltages.
switch
An electrical device that opens and closes a circuit; it may be manually operated, automatically operated by some other electrical circuit, or operated by the change in some physical condition such as flow, level, or temperature.
switched reluctance motor
A motor that relies on induced magnetism in salient poles, instead of a rotor winding.
switched-mode power supply
A power converter that regulates voltage by adjusting the time duration of a switching device; this gives reduced heat dissipation compared to an equivalent linear regulator device.
switchgear
An array of switches, circuit breakers and related apparatus for power distribution.
symbolic circuit analysis
Analytical circuit analysis in terms of expressions with variables, instead of numerical solutions for a particular case of values.
symmetrical components
A technique to simplify analysis of unbalanced polyphase systems.
synchro
A synchromotor, a class of electrical motors that follows the rotation of a source.
synchronization
Aligning the timing of two or more sources, such as synchronizing a generator before connecting it to a grid.
synchronous circuit
A logic circuit where internal state changes only propagate in step with a master clock signal.
synchronous motor
A motor that rotates at a speed exactly related to the supply frequency.
synchronous rectification
A converter from alternating to direct current, where switching devices actively are operated in step with the positive and negative excursions of the supply.
synchroscope
An instrument used to bring an alternating current generator into synchronization with a grid, that uses a moving pointer or set of lamps.
system identification
The technique of development of a mathematical model of a controlled system; model identification.
system on a chip
An integrated circuit that combines multiple significant subsystems of a product on one die, for example, analog signal processing and digital controls.
system on module
A packaging of significant functions of a complete product in a form that can be used in more than one product.

== T ==
tachometer
An instrument that measures rotational speed (or angular velocity).
tap
A connection to a winding at some point between the ends, used to adjust voltage.
tap changer
A switch that selects which transformer tap is connected to an external circuit; may be manually operated, or power operated; some types can be operated under load for voltage regulation purposes.
technical drawing
Drawings intended to convey information for construction, operation or maintenance of a system or equipment.
telecommunication
The field that deals with transmission of information over distances longer than can be covered by an unaided human.
Telecommunications Industry Association
A US based trade association that develops technical standards.
telegraph
A system for transmitting text messages, by wire or other means.
telegrapher's equations
Coupled linear partial differential equations that relate the voltage and current on a transmission line.
telephone balance unit
A balun, a transformer used to convert between balanced and unbalanced lines, as used in telephone circuits.
telephone line
Outside plant that connects a central office to subscriber equipment.
telephone
Transmission of voice by electrical means.
television
Transmission of moving images by electrical means.
Tellegen's theorem
A theorem relating to branch currents in an electrical network.
tesla
The SI unit of magnetic flux density.
Tesla coil
A kind of resonant transformer capable of very high voltages; almost identical to an Oudin coil except that it has separately wound primary and secondary.
tetrode
An electron device, nearly always a vacuum tube, with four internal active electrodes.
thermionic emission
Emission of electrons from a hot surface; the Edison Effect was an early instance of description of this phenomenon.
thermistor
A temperature sensitive resistor with a large, somewhat variable, temperature coefficient of resistance.
thermocouple
A junction of two dissimilar metals that generates voltage when at a temperature above absolute zero.
thermoelectric effect
The conversion between heat flow and current flow, and the reverse.
thermostat
A temperature sensing switch.
Thévenin theorem
A theorem which states that any network of current sources, voltage sources and resistors can be simplified to an equivalent network with only a voltage source and series impedance; the dual of Norton's Theorem.
third rail
An energized conductor in the track bed, using a sliding contact to transfer power to an electric train.
three-phase AC railway electrification
Application of three-phase power to railways.
three-phase electric power
Electric power transmission using three conductors carrying currents which peak at separate evenly spaced times in each cycle; widely used for motors.
thyristor
A four layer semiconductor device that stands off applied voltage until triggered.
thyristor drive
A variable speed drive, usually with direct current motors, using thyristors as the switching elements.
tidal power
Extraction of useful energy, usually as electric power, from the tidal rise and fall of water.
time sharing
A system whereby multiple human users of a computer can proceed as if they had sole use, while the computer processes each user's software in round-robin fashion.
time-invariant system
A systems whose characteristics don't vary significantly with time.
topology
The shape of an electrical network, independent of its size or values.
toroidal inductors and transformers
Magnetic coils wound around a ring of ferromagnetic material.
total harmonic distortion (THD)
A measure of the magnitude of harmonically-related frequency components a signal processing stage adds.
traction battery
A battery used to store energy for propelling a wheeled electric vehicle.
traction current
Power supply for wheeled electric vehicles.
traction motor
An electric motor for a wheeled vehicle.
traction substation
A substation that supplies current to a railway, subway or similar electric wheeled transit.
transatlantic communications cable
A cable for voice or data running under the Atlantic Ocean.
transceiver
Apparatus that combines a receiver and transmitter.
transconductance
transducer
An instrument that converts a physical quantity into another electrical or physical quantity.
transfer function
The mathematical relation between input and output, usually expressed in terms of frequency or complex frequency (s-domain).
transformer oil testing
Examination of transformer oil for its insulating strength, dissolved moisture and other properties, to ensure it is still suitable for use.
transformer oil
A hydrocarbon liquid that cools and insulates transformers and other types of electrical apparatus.
transformer
A static arrangement of conductors and possibly magnetic materials, that transfers energy by electromagnetic induction.
transformerboard
A kind of insulating paperboard used for internal structures of large oil filled power transformers.
transient response
The short-time response of a system to a disturbance.
Transil
A brand of transient voltage suppression diode.
transistor
A three terminal solid state device used as an amplifier or switch.
transmission
The process of getting a signal from one point to another.
transmission line
An arrangement of conductors for movement of electric power; used from DC to upper radio frequencies.
transmission system operator
A corporation that runs the transmission system between sources of power and distribution substations.
transmission tower
A structure for support of overhead transmission wires.
transmitter
Apparatus that prepares a signal for emission into some medium, such as a radio transmitter or a sonar transmitter.
traveling-wave tube
A type of microwave amplifier vacuum tube.
trembler coil
A kind of high-voltage coil that includes an interrupting mechanism, formerly used in automobile ignition systems.
TRIAC
A variation of the thyristor that can pass bidirectional (ac) current.
triangle wave
A waveform composed of straight-line segments that extend from minus peak to plus peak.
trigger transformer
A transformer that generates a pulse to initiate some other device, such as a thyristor or a flash tube.
triode
An electron device, nearly always a vacuum tube, that has three active electrodes.
trolley pole
A support for a current collector on a vehicle.
trolleybus
Strictly, a passenger vehicle that collects motive electric power from a pair of overhead conductors.
tuned circuit
A circuit that displays a peak response at some frequency.
twisted pair
Two wires twisted around each other, possibly covered with an overall sheath; this configuration rejects some kinds of interference.
two-phase electric power
An electric power system using two sets of alternating currents, displaced in time by a quarter period.
two-port network
A network that has two places to exchange energy with its surroundings.
two-sided Laplace transform
A variant of the Laplace transform that simplifies certain operations.

== U ==
ubiquitous computing
A scenario where computer science is made to appear everywhere.
ultrasonic motor
A motor that relies on a component oscillating at an ultrasonic frequency.
ultrasonics
Term for the field of study pertaining to pressure oscillations in air or other media that are above the range of human hearing.
ultrasound
Sound having a frequency above the range of normal human hearing. A portmanteau of the former description of 'ultrasonic sound'
undersampling
Sampling a signal at less than the Nyquist rate; can produce alias frequencies or other artifacts.
unijunction transistor
A three terminal semiconductor device with a definite switching characteristic and only one PN junction.
unshielded twisted pair
Two wires wrapped around each other, but without a conductive cover.
upsampling
Sampling at greater than the Nyquist rate, which makes filter design easier.
utility frequency
60 or 50 cycles per second, used for electric power.
utility pole
A columnar structure that carries wires for electrical power distribution, cable television, telephone or similar services.

== V ==
vacuum capacitor
A capacitor using vacuum as its dielectric; useful at high voltages or radio frequency.
vacuum tube
An electron device that relies on flow of electrons through a vacuum or low-pressure gas; a valve. The first electronic devices that could amplify.
valve
A switching element (mercury arc, thyristor, or other device) in a high-voltage direct current converter; each phase contains two or more valves, which may be series-connected for higher voltages. Or, a vacuum tube.
variable capacitor
A capacitor whose value can be changed, by rotating a shaft, squeezing a plate or by an electrical signal; for example, as used to tune a radio.
variable-frequency drive
A power converter that varies the speed of an AC motor by changing its frequency; usually, today, a solid-state device.
Variac
One brand of adjustable transformer, that can essentially continuously vary the ratio between primary and secondary.
varicap
Variable capacitor – usually a diode whose reverse-biased junction capacitance can be varied by applied voltage.
varistor
Variable resistor – a protective device that has a high resistance at low voltage but momentarily switches to lower resistance on exposure to a high voltage.
vector control
A strategy for control of variable-speed motor drives.
vector group
The classification of the connections of a polyphase transformer.
vehicle-to-grid
A concept to use electric vehicle batteries as a form of grid energy storage.
vehicular automation
Automatic systems to assist, or replace, the driver of a vehicle.
Versorium
An antique version of an electroscope.
vibrator
An electromechanical interrupter, part of a DC-to-AC converter in a battery-operated vacuum tube radio, or similar application. Some had additional contacts to act as a synchronous rectifier.
video camera tube
A family of vacuum tube devices used to pick up images and transmit them electronically.
video processing
The techniques used to enhance video images.
virtual instrumentation
A software-intensive measuring system that can be programmed to emulate any of a number of conventional measuring instruments, or some combination of measuring functions.
virtual power plant
A strategy for managing a collection of disparate power sources, interconnected with a communications network, as if they were a single centralized power plant.
VLSI
Very Large Scale Integration, the ability to put hundreds of thousands of interconnected transistors onto one chip.
volt
The SI unit of electrical potential difference; moving a charge of one coulomb through a potential of one volt transfers one joule of energy.
voltage
The electric potential difference between two points.
voltage compensation
Generally, adjustment of a voltage source to compensate for voltage drop; techniques differ widely between a computer power supply and a long-distance power line.
voltage-controlled amplifier
An amplifier that has its gain controlled by a voltage signal.
voltage controller
A device that adjusts the (effective) voltage to a load.
voltage converter
Any device that changes electric power at one voltage to power at a second; a transformer is a common example of an AC voltage converter.
voltage division
A circuit that produces an output voltage that is some, perhaps adjustable, fraction of the input voltage.
voltage doubler
A rectifier circuit that can product an output DC voltage of nearly twice the input AC voltage.
voltage regulation
A measure of how a source maintains its output voltage for varying load.
voltage regulator
A system that automatically stabilizes the voltage at which power is supplied to a downstream system.
voltage source
In circuit theory, a hypothetical element that maintains a specified voltage between its terminals independent of the current through it.
voltage spike
A transient electrical voltage higher than normal appearing on an electrical supply.
voltage-to-current converter
A circuit that produces an output current proportional to an input voltage.
volt-ampere
The unit of apparent power in an AC circuit.
voltmeter
An instrument for measuring potential difference.

== W ==
war of the currents
The late 19th century commercial dispute on whether AC or DC was the best system for power distribution.
Ward Leonard control
A speed control system for DC machines using an interconnected generator and motor.
watt
The SI unit of power, work done per unit time.
wattmeter
An instrument that measures electrical power.
waveguide
A tubular structure that guides electromagnetic waves, much used at microwave frequencies; an optical fiber is a kind of optical waveguide.
weber
The SI unit of magnetic flux.
wet transformer
In telephone systems, a matching transformer that can operate while carrying a substantial DC "wetting" current.
Wien bridge oscillator
A type of electronic oscillator that generates sine waves and is based on a bridge circuit.
Wiener filter
A class of filters used in signal processing, used to fit an estimate to noisy signal data.
Williams tube
A cathode ray vacuum tube used as an early form of computer memory.
wind farm
An array of two or more wind turbines, usually sharing a substation.
wind power
Generation of electricity (sometimes mechanical power) from wind.
wind turbine
A rotating machine that extracts energy from wind.
wire
A strand of metal much, much, longer than it is wide; a conductor, often coated with insulation.
wireless network
Data network relying on radio for the connection to end device; may span a building or a larger area.
wireless telegraphy
Transmission of text by radio; usually implies Morse or radio-teletype.

== X ==
X-ray
Electromagnetic radiation with wavelengths shorter than ten nanometres. Strictly: radiation that is produced in the electron shell of atoms.
X-ray lithography
A developing technique for production of very high density structures in integrated circuits.

== Y ==
Yagi antenna
A type of radio antenna using a feeder element, one or more parasitic reflector elements, and one or more director parasitic elements to provide a directional characteristic; the classic home TV rooftop antenna was usually a Yagi antenna.
Y-delta transform
A mathematical technique in circuit analysis to simplify a circuit.

== Z ==
Zener diode
Nickname for "voltage regulator diodes" which may rely either on the Zener effect or avalanche breakdown to maintain a roughly constant voltage; the two effects have opposite temperature coefficients of voltage.
Ziegler-Nichols tuning method
It is a heuristic method of tuning a PID controller.
zigzag transformer
A multiwinding three phase transformer, sometimes used for grounding.
Z-transform
A mathematical operation that converts a set of evenly spaced measurements of an analog signal into a series of frequency components.

HVDC Technology: High Voltage Direct Current. It plays a crucial role in modern renewable energy integration and grid decarbonization.

== See also ==
- Glossary of engineering
- Glossary of civil engineering
- Glossary of mechanical engineering
- Glossary of structural engineering
