= KIMO Industrie Elektronik GmbH =

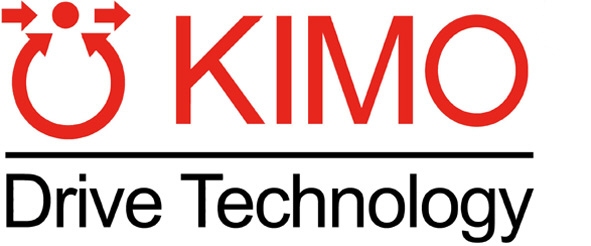
- Company type: limited company
- Industry: Electrical equipment
- Founded: 1989
- Headquarters: Erlangen, Germany
- Area served: Worldwide
- Key people: Dr. Frank Oswald Hake (MD)
- Products: Power technology, Industrial automation
- Website: www.kimo.de

KIMO Industrie-Elektronik GmbH is a German private limited company located in Erlangen southern part of Germany. Founded in 1989 the company develops, manufactures and sell solutions for electronic drive technology and power electronics. KIMO is known to have produced Motor soft starters and other motor control devices, holding patents in power electronics has given Braking chopper solutions for port cranes at Fort de France in Martinique

== Product range ==
The company manufactures drive solutions with power range from 0.25 kW up to 2000 kW. and from 110 V up to 690 V.

== Products ==
- Soft starter
- DC Injection Braking unit
- Voltage controller
- Braking chopper
- Variable frequency drive
- Regenerative frequency drives
