= Braking unit =

Braking unit also some times referred as Dynamic braking unit may refer to:

- DC injection braking unit, an electrical braking device for ac motors
- Regenerative braking unit, regenerative braking systems used in traction motors
- Electromagnetic brake, devices using electromagnetic forces to mechanically brake
- Braking chopper, an electronic switch used to dissipate high voltage in an intermediate circuit
