= Motor soft starter =

Device used with AC electrical motors

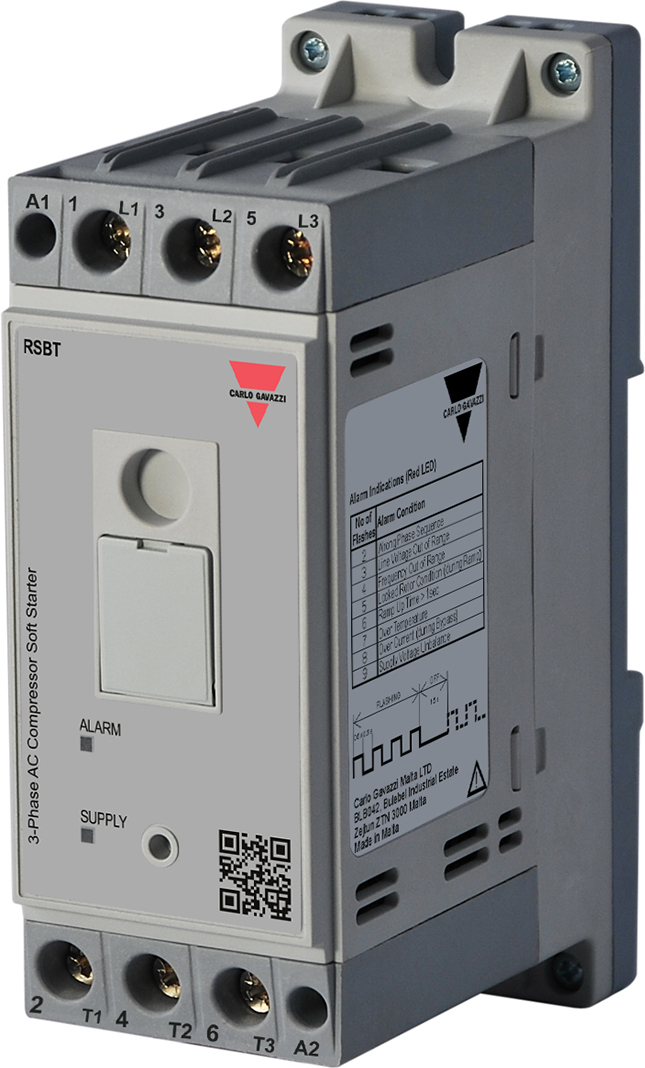
Compact soft starter for a 3 phase machine, 15kW/10HP

A motor soft starter is a device used with AC electrical motors to temporarily reduce the load and torque in the powertrain and electric current surge of the motor during start-up. This reduces the mechanical stress on the motor and shaft, as well as the electrodynamic stresses on the attached power cables and electrical distribution network, extending the lifespan of the system.

It can consist of mechanical or electrical devices, or a combination of both. Mechanical soft starters include clutches and several types of couplings using a fluid, magnetic forces, or steel shot to transmit torque, similar to other forms of torque limiter. Electrical soft starters can be any control system that reduces the torque by temporarily reducing the voltage or current input, or a device that temporarily alters how the motor is connected in the electric circuit.

== Operating principles ==
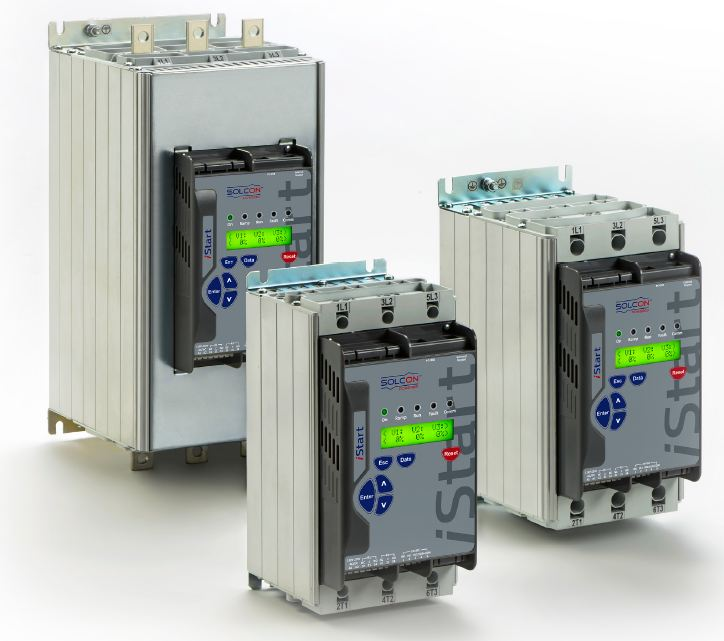
Digital-control soft starters

Whenever the armature of an electric motor is moving, both the motor action and generator action are occurring simultaneously; the electromagnetic force produced by generator action opposes the desired motor action and effectively creates a variable motor resistance which increases with motor speed. When a voltage is applied to the motor, this resistance dictates the current drawn by the motor. At rest, the resistance is relatively low, so the starting or inrush current can be high if the full line voltage is applied to the motor. Compared to DC motors, AC motors tend to have significantly higher stator resistance and correspondingly lower inrush current.

Nevertheless, across-the-line starting of induction motors is accompanied by inrush currents up to 7-10 times higher than the running current, and higher-efficiency motors can experience inrush currents 10-15 times the running current. In addition, starting torque can be up to 3 times higher than running torque. The starting torque transient can create a sudden mechanical stress on the machine, which leads to a reduced service life. Moreover, the high inrush current stresses the power supply, which may lead to voltage dips. As a result, lifespan of sensitive equipment may be reduced. Another common side effect, especially in residential installations, is voltage sag in the site's power supply created by the high inrush current, visible as flickering lights.

A soft starter continuously controls the motor's voltage supply during the start-up phase. This way, the motor is adjusted to the machine's load behavior. Mechanical operating equipment is accelerated smoothly. This lengthens service life, improves operating behavior, and smooths work flows. Electrical soft starters can use solid state devices to control the current flow and therefore the voltage applied to the motor. They can be connected in series with the line voltage applied to the motor, or can be connected inside the delta (Δ) loop of a delta-connected motor, controlling the voltage applied to each winding. Solid state soft starters can control one or more phases of the voltage applied to the induction motor with the best results achieved by three-phase control. Soft starters controlled via two phases have the disadvantage that the uncontrolled phase will always show some current imbalance with respect to the controlled phases. Typically, the voltage is controlled by reverse-parallel-connected silicon-controlled rectifiers (thyristors), but in some circumstances with three-phase control, the control elements can be a reverse-parallel-connected SCR and diode.

Another way to limit motor starting current is a series reactor. If an air core is used for the series reactor then a very efficient and reliable soft starter can be designed which is suitable for all types of 3 phase induction motor [ synchronous / asynchronous ] ranging from 25 kW 415 V to 30 MW 11 kV. Using an air core series reactor soft starter is very common practice for applications like pump, compressor, fan etc. Usually high starting torque applications do not use this method.

== Applications ==
Soft starters can be set up to the requirements of the individual application. Compared to variable-frequency drives, soft starters require very few user adjustments. Some soft starters also include a "learning" process to automatically adapt the drive settings to the characteristics of a motor load, to reduce the power inrush requirement at the start. In pump applications, a soft starter can avoid pressure surges that could lead to water hammer. Conveyor belt systems can be smoothly started, avoiding jerk and stress on drive components. Fans or other systems with belt drives can be started slowly to avoid belt slipping as well as air pressure surges. Soft starters are seen in electrical R/C helicopters, and allow the rotor blades to spool-up in a smooth, controlled manner rather than a sudden surge. In all systems, a soft start limits the inrush current and so improves stability of the power supply and reduces transient voltage drops that may affect other loads.

== See also ==
- Adjustable-speed drive
- Braking chopper
- DC motor starter section of Electric motor
- Electronic speed control
- Korndorfer starter
- Motor controller
- Space Vector Modulation
- Thyristor drive
- Variable-frequency drive
- Variable-speed air compressor
- Vector control (motor)
