= Harmonics (electrical power) =

Sinusoidal wave whose frequency is an integer multiple

In an electric power system, a harmonic of a voltage or current waveform is a sinusoidal wave whose frequency is an integer multiple of the fundamental frequency. Harmonic frequencies are produced by the action of non-linear loads such as rectifiers, discharge lighting, or saturated electric machines. They are a frequent cause of power quality problems and can result in increased equipment and conductor heating, misfiring in variable speed drives, and torque pulsations in motors and generators.

Many non-linear electrical loads draw current only during portions of each AC cycle, producing a periodic but non-sinusoidal current waveform. If the waveform is periodic, it can be represented by a Fourier series as the sum of the fundamental frequency and harmonic components at integer multiples of the fundamental frequency.

Harmonics are usually classified by two different criteria: the type of signal (voltage or current), and the order of the harmonic (even, odd, triplen, or non-triplen odd); in a three-phase system, they can be further classified according to their phase sequence (positive, negative, zero).

The measurement of the level of harmonics is covered by the IEC 61000-4-7 standard.

== Current harmonics ==
In a normal alternating current power system, the current varies sinusoidally at a specific frequency, usually 50 or 60 hertz. When a linear time-invariant electrical load is connected to the system, it draws a sinusoidal current at the same frequency as the voltage, although not always in phase with the voltage).

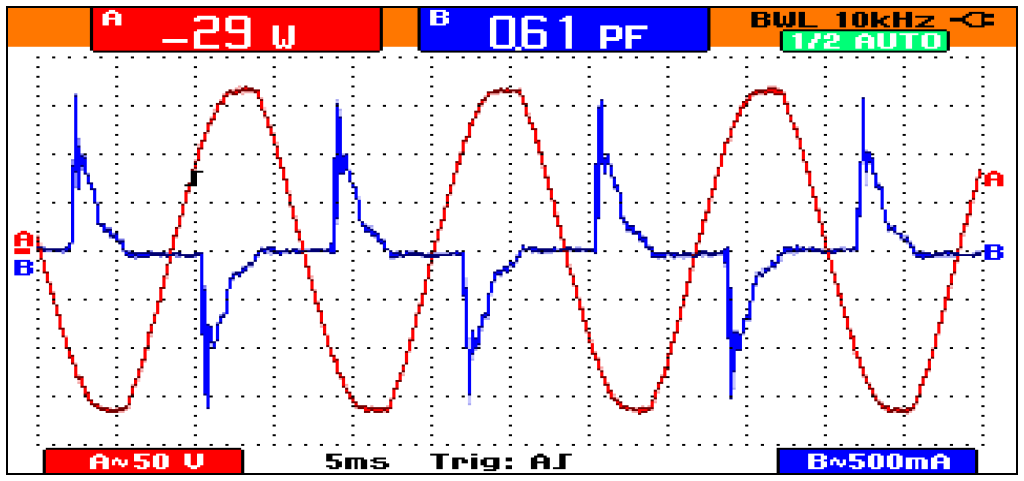
A compact fluorescent lamp is one example of an electrical load with a non-linear characteristic, due to the rectifier circuit it uses. The current waveform, blue, is highly distorted.

Current harmonics are caused by non-linear loads. When a non-linear load, such as a rectifier is connected to the system, it draws a current that is not sinusoidal. The current waveform distortion can be quite complex, depending on the type of load and its interaction with other components of the system.

Regardless of how complex the current waveform becomes, the Fourier series transform makes it possible to deconstruct the complex waveform into a series of simple sinusoids, which start at the power system fundamental frequency and occur at integer multiples of the fundamental frequency. In power systems, harmonics are defined as positive integer multiples of the fundamental frequency. Thus, the third harmonic is the third multiple of the fundamental frequency.

Harmonics in power systems are generated by non-linear loads. Semiconductor devices like transistors, IGBTs, MOSFETs, diodes, etc. are all non-linear loads. Further examples of non-linear loads include common office equipment such as computers and printers, fluorescent lighting, battery chargers and also variable-speed drives. Electric motors do not normally contribute significantly to harmonic generation. Both motors and transformers will however create harmonics when they are over-fluxed or saturated.

Non-linear load currents create distortion in the pure sinusoidal voltage waveform supplied by the utility, and this may result in resonance. The even harmonics do not normally exist in power system due to symmetry between the positive- and negative- halves of a cycle. Further, if the waveforms of the three phases are symmetrical, the harmonic multiples of three are suppressed by delta (Δ) connection of transformers and motors as described below.

If we focus for example on only the third harmonic, we can see how all harmonics with a multiple of three behaves in powers systems. Power is supplied by a three phase system, where each phase is 120 degrees apart. This is done for two reasons: mainly because three-phase generators and motors are simpler to construct due to constant torque developed across the three phase phases; and secondly, if the three phases are balanced, they sum to zero, and the size of neutral conductors can be reduced or even omitted in some cases. Both these measures results in significant costs savings to utility companies.

=== Third-order harmonics ===
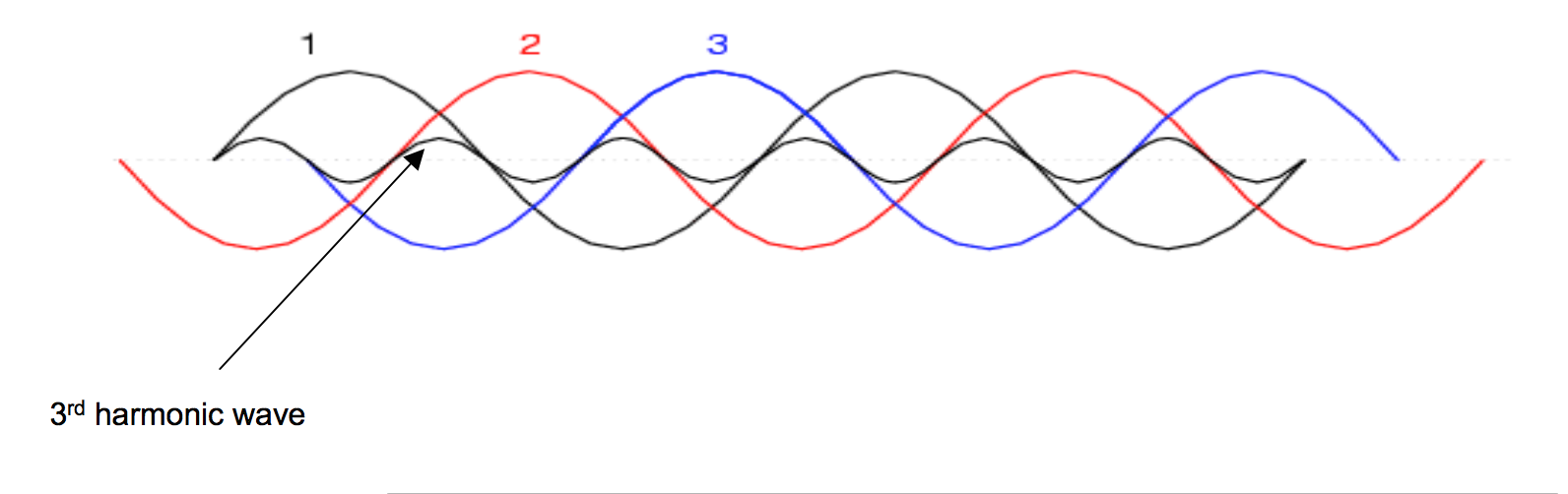
3rd Order Harmonic Addition

However, balanced third harmonic current will not add to zero in the neutral. As seen in the figure, the 3rd harmonic will add constructively across the three phases. This leads to a current in the neutral conductor at three times the fundamental frequency, which can cause problems if the system is not designed for it, (i.e. conductors sized only for normal operation.) To reduce the effect of the third order harmonics, delta connections are used as attenuators, or third harmonic shorts as the current circulates in the delta the connection instead of flowing in the neutral of a Y-Δ transformer (wye connection).

== Voltage harmonics ==
Voltage harmonics are mostly caused by current harmonics. The voltage provided by the voltage source will be distorted by current harmonics due to source impedance. If the source impedance of the voltage source is small, current harmonics will cause only small voltage harmonics. It is typically the case that voltage harmonics are indeed small compared to current harmonics. For that reason, the voltage waveform can usually be approximated by the fundamental frequency of voltage. If this approximation is used, current harmonics produce no effect on the real power transferred to the load. An intuitive way to see this comes from sketching the voltage wave at fundamental frequency and overlaying a current harmonic with no phase shift (in order to more easily observe the following phenomenon). What can be observed is that for every period of voltage, there is equal area above the horizontal axis and below the current harmonic wave as there is below the axis and above the current harmonic wave. This means that the average real power contributed by current harmonics is equal to zero. However, if higher harmonics of voltage are considered, then current harmonics do make a contribution to the real power transferred to the load.

A set of three line (or line-to-line) voltages in a balanced three-phase (three-wire or four-wire) power system cannot contain harmonics whose frequency is an integer multiple of the frequency of the third harmonics (i.e., harmonics of order $h = 3 n$), which includes triplen harmonics (i.e., harmonics of order $h = 3 (2 n - 1)$). This occurs because otherwise Kirchhoff's voltage law (KVL) would be violated: such harmonics are in phase, so their sum for the three phases is not zero, however KVL requires the sum of such voltages to be zero, which requires the sum of such harmonics to be also zero. With the same argument, a set of three line currents in a balanced three-wire three-phase power system cannot contain harmonics whose frequency is an integer multiple of the frequency of the third harmonics; but a four-wire system can, and the triplen harmonics of the line currents would constitute the neutral current.

== Even, odd, triplen and non-triplen odd harmonics ==
The harmonics of a distorted (non-sinusoidal) periodic signal can be classified according to their order.

The cyclic frequency (in hertz) of the harmonics are usually written as $f_n$ or $f_h$, and they are equal to $n f_0$ or $h f_0$, where $n$ or $h$ is the order of the harmonics (which are integer numbers) and $f_0$ is the fundamental cyclic frequency of the distorted (non-sinusoidal) periodic signal. Similarly, the angular frequency (in radians per second) of the harmonics are written as $\omega_n$ or $\omega_h$, and they are equal to $n \omega_0$ or $h \omega_0$, where $\omega_0$ is the fundamental angular frequency of the distorted (non-sinusoidal) periodic signal. The angular frequency is related to the cyclic frequency as $\omega = 2 \pi f$ (valid for harmonics as well as the fundamental component).

=== Even harmonics ===
The even harmonics of a distorted (non-sinusoidal) periodic signal are harmonics whose frequency is a non-zero even integer multiple of the fundamental frequency of the distorted signal (which is the same as the frequency of the fundamental component). So, their order is given by:
$$h = 2 k, \quad k \in \N \quad \text{(even harmonics)}$$
where $k$ is an integer number; for example, $h = 2, 4, 6, 8, 10$. If the distorted signal is represented in the trigonometric form or the amplitude-phase form of the Fourier series, then $k$ takes only positive integer values (not including zero), that is it takes values from the set of natural numbers; if the distorted signal is represented in the complex exponential form of the Fourier series, then $k$ takes negative and positive integer values (not including zero, since the DC component is usually not considered as a harmonic).

=== Odd harmonics ===
The odd harmonics of a distorted (non-sinusoidal) periodic signal are harmonics whose frequency is an odd integer multiple of the fundamental frequency of the distorted signal (which is the same as the frequency of the fundamental component). So, their order is given by:
$$h = 2 k - 1, \quad k \in \N \quad \text{(odd harmonics)}$$
for example, $h = 1, 3, 5, 7, 9$.

In distorted periodic signals (or waveforms) that possess half-wave symmetry, which means the waveform during the negative half cycle is equal to the negative of the waveform during the positive half cycle, all of the even harmonics are zero ($a_{2k} = b_{2k} = A_{2k} = 0$) and the DC component is also zero ($a_0 = 0$), so they only have odd harmonics ($A_{2k-1} \ne 0$); these odd harmonics in general are cosine terms as well as sine terms, but in certain waveforms such as square waves the cosine terms are zero ($a_{2k-1} = 0$, $b_{2k-1} \ne 0$). In many non-linear loads such as inverters, AC voltage controllers and cycloconverters, the output voltage(s) waveform(s) usually has half-wave symmetry and so it only contains odd harmonics.

The fundamental component is an odd harmonic, since when $k=1$, the above formula yields $h=1$, which is the order of the fundamental component. If the fundamental component is excluded from the odd harmonics, then the order of the remaining harmonics is given by:
$$h = 2 k + 1, \quad k \in \N \quad \text{(odd harmonics that aren't the fundamental)}$$
for example, $h = 3, 5, 7, 9, 11$.

=== Triplen harmonics ===
The triplen harmonics of a distorted (non-sinusoidal) periodic signal are harmonics whose frequency is an odd integer multiple of the frequency of the third harmonic(s) of the distorted signal, resulting in a current in the neutral conductor. Their order is given by:
$$h = 3(2k-1), \quad k \in \N \quad \text{(triplen harmonics)}$$
for example, $h = 3, 9, 15, 21, 27$.

All triplen harmonics are also odd harmonics, but not all odd harmonics are also triplen harmonics.

=== Non-triplen odd harmonics ===
Certain distorted (non-sinusoidal) periodic signals only possess harmonics that are neither even nor triplen harmonics, for example the output voltage of a three-phase wye-connected AC voltage controller with phase angle control and a firing angle of $\alpha = 45^\circ$ and with a purely resistive load connected to its output and fed with three-phase sinusoidal balanced voltages. Their order is given by:
$$h = \frac{1}{2} (6 \, k + [-1]^k - 3), \quad k \in \N \quad \text{(non-triplen odd harmonics)}$$
for example, $h = 1, 5, 7, 11, 13, 17, 19, 23, 25$.

All harmonics that are not even harmonics nor triplen harmonics are also odd harmonics, but not all odd harmonics are also harmonics that are not even harmonics nor triplen harmonics.

If the fundamental component is excluded from the harmonics that are not even nor triplen harmonics, then the order of the remaining harmonics is given by:
$$h = \frac{1}{2} (-1)^k (6 \, k[-1]^k + 3[-1]^k - 1), \quad k \in \N \quad \text{(non-triplen odd harmonics that aren't the fundamental)}$$

or also by:
$$h = 6 k \mp 1, \quad k \in \N \quad \text{(non-triplen odd harmonics that aren't the fundamental)}$$

for example, $h = 5, 7, 11, 13, 17, 19, 23, 25$. In this latter case, these harmonics are called by IEEE as nontriple odd harmonics.

== Positive sequence, negative sequence and zero sequence harmonics ==
In the case of balanced three-phase systems (three-wire or four-wire), the harmonics of a set of three distorted (non-sinusoidal) periodic signals can also be classified according to their phase sequence.

=== Positive sequence harmonics ===
The positive sequence harmonics of a set of three-phase distorted (non-sinusoidal) periodic signals are harmonics that have the same phase sequence as that of the three original signals, and are phase-shifted in time by 120° between each other for a given frequency or order. It can be proven the positive sequence harmonics are harmonics whose order is given by:
$$h = 3 k - 2, \quad k \in \N \quad \text{(positive sequence harmonics)}$$
for example, $h = 1, 4, 7, 10, 13$.

The fundamental components of the three signals are positive sequence harmonics, since when $k = 1$, the above formula yields $h = 1$, which is the order of the fundamental components. If the fundamental components are excluded from the positive sequence harmonics, then the order of the remaining harmonics is given by:
$$h = 3 k + 1, \quad k \in \N \quad \text{(positive sequence harmonics that aren't the fundamentals)}$$
for example, $h = 4, 7, 10, 13, 16$.

=== Negative sequence harmonics ===
The negative sequence harmonics of a set of three-phase distorted (non-sinusoidal) periodic signals are harmonics that have an opposite phase sequence to that of the three original signals, and are phase-shifted in time by 120° for a given frequency or order. It can be proven the negative sequence harmonics are harmonics whose order is given by:
$$h = 3 k - 1, \quad k \in \N \quad \text{(negative sequence harmonics)}$$
for example, $h = 2, 5, 8, 11, 14$.

=== Zero sequence harmonics ===
The zero sequence harmonics of a set of three-phase distorted (non-sinusoidal) periodic signals are harmonics that are in phase in time for a given frequency or order. It can be proven the zero sequence harmonics are harmonics whose frequency is an integer multiple of the frequency of the third harmonics. So, their order is given by:
$$h = 3 k, \quad k \in \N \quad \text{(zero sequence harmonics)}$$
for example, $h = 3, 6, 9, 12, 15$.

All triplen harmonics are also zero sequence harmonics, but not all zero sequence harmonics are also triplen harmonics.

== Total harmonic distortion ==
Total harmonic distortion, or THD is a common measurement of the level of harmonic distortion present in power systems. THD can be related to either current harmonics or voltage harmonics, and it is defined as the ratio of the RMS value of all harmonics to the RMS value of the fundamental component times 100%; the DC component is neglected.

$$\begin{alignat}{3}
\mathit{THD}_\mathrm{V} &= \frac{ \sqrt{V_2^2 + V_3^2 + V_4^2 + \cdots + V_n^2} }{V_1} \cdot 100\% &&= \frac{ \sqrt{ \sum_{k \mathop = 2}^{n}V_k^2} }{V_1} \cdot 100\% \\
\mathit{THD}_\mathrm{I} &= \frac{ \sqrt{I_2^2 + I_3^2 + I_4^2 + \cdots + I_n^2} }{I_1} \cdot 100\% &&= \frac{ \sqrt{ \sum_{k \mathop = 2}^{n}I_k^2} }{I_1} \cdot 100\%
\end{alignat}$$

where V_{k} is the RMS voltage of the k-th harmonic, I_{k} is the RMS current of the k-th harmonic, and k = 1 is the order of the fundamental component.

It is usually the case that we neglect higher voltage harmonics; however, if we do not neglect them, real power transferred to the load is affected by harmonics. Average real power can be found by adding the product of voltage and current (and power factor, denoted by pf here) at each higher frequency to the product of voltage and current at the fundamental frequency, or
$${P_{\mathrm{avg}}} = \sum_{k \mathop = 1}^{\infty} V_k \cdot I_k \cdot pf = P_{\mathrm{avg}, 1} + P_{\mathrm{avg}, 2} + \cdots$$
where V_{k} and I_{k} are the RMS voltage and current magnitudes at harmonic k (k = 1 denotes the fundamental frequency), and $P_{\mathrm{avg}, 1}$ is the conventional definition of power without factoring in harmonic components.

The power factor mentioned above is the displacement power factor. There is another power factor that depends on THD. True power factor can be taken to mean the ratio between average real power and the magnitude of RMS voltage and current, $pf_{\mathrm{true}} = \frac{P_{\mathrm{avg}}}{V_{\mathrm{rms}} I_{\mathrm{rms}}}$.
$$\begin{align}
{V_{\mathrm{rms}}} &= V_{1, \mathrm{rms}} \sqrt{ 1 + \left(\frac{ \mathit{THD}_\mathrm{V}}{100}\right)^2} \\
{I_{\mathrm{rms}}} &= I_{1, \mathrm{rms}} \sqrt{ 1 + \left(\frac{ \mathit{THD}_\mathrm{I}}{100}\right)^2}
\end{align}$$
Substituting this in for the equation for true power factor, it becomes clear that the quantity can be taken to have two components, one of which is the traditional power factor (neglecting the influence of harmonics) and one of which is the contribution of the harmonics to power factor:
$${pf_{\mathrm{true}}} = \frac{ P_{\mathrm{avg}}}{V_{1, \mathrm{rms}} I_{1, \mathrm{rms}}} \cdot \frac{1}{ \sqrt{ 1 + \left( \frac{\mathit{THD}_\mathrm{V}}{100}\right)^2} \sqrt{ 1 + \left( \frac{ \mathit{THD}_\mathrm{I}}{100}\right)^2}}.$$

Names are assigned to the two distinct factors as follows:
$$pf_{\mathrm{true}} = pf_{\mathrm{disp}} \cdot pf_{\mathrm{dist}},$$
where $pf_{\mathrm{disp}}$ is the displacement power factor and $pf_{\mathrm{dist}}$ is the distortion power factor (i.e. the contribution of the harmonics to the total power factor).

== Effects ==
One of the major effects of power system harmonics is to increase the current in the system. This is particularly the case for the third harmonic, which causes a sharp increase in the zero sequence current, and therefore increases the current in the neutral conductor. This effect can require special consideration in the design of an electric system to serve non-linear loads.

In addition to the increased line current, different pieces of electrical equipment can suffer effects from harmonics on the power system.

=== Motors ===
Electric motors experience losses due to hysteresis and eddy currents set up in the iron core of the motor. These are proportional to the frequency of the current. Since the harmonics are at higher frequencies, they produce higher core losses in a motor than the power frequency would. This results in increased heating of the motor core which, if excessive, can shorten the life of the motor. The 5th harmonic causes a CEMF (counter electromotive force) in large motors which acts in the opposite direction of rotation. The CEMF is not large enough to counteract the rotation; however it does play a small role in the resulting rotating speed of the motor.

=== Telephones ===
In the United States, common telephone lines are designed to transmit frequencies between 300 and 3400 Hz. Because electric power in the United States is distributed at 60 Hz, it normally does not interfere with telephone communications because its frequency is too low.

== Sources ==
A pure sinusoidal voltage is a conceptual quantity produced by an ideal AC generator built with finely distributed stator and field windings that operate in a uniform magnetic field. Since neither the winding distribution nor the magnetic field are uniform in a working AC machine, voltage waveform distortions are created, and the voltage-time relationship deviates from the pure sine function. The distortion at the point of generation is very small (about 1% to 2%), but nonetheless it exists. Because this is a deviation from a pure sine wave, the deviation is in the form of a periodic function, and by definition, the voltage distortion contains harmonics.

When a sinusoidal voltage is applied to a linear time-invariant load, such as a heating element, the current through it is also sinusoidal. In non-linear and/or time-variant loads, such as an amplifier with a clipping distortion, the voltage swing of the applied sinusoid is limited and the pure tone is polluted with a plethora of harmonics.

When there is significant impedance in the path from the power source to a nonlinear load, these current distortions will also produce distortions in the voltage waveform at the load. However, in most cases where the power delivery system is functioning correctly under normal conditions, the voltage distortions will be quite small and can usually be ignored.

Waveform distortion can be mathematically analysed to show that it is equivalent to superimposing additional frequency components onto a pure sinewave. These frequencies are harmonics (integer multiples) of the fundamental frequency, and can sometimes propagate outwards from nonlinear loads, causing problems elsewhere on the power system.

The classic example of a non-linear load is a rectifier with a capacitor input filter, where the rectifier diode only allows current to pass to the load during the time that the applied voltage exceeds the voltage stored in the capacitor, which might be a relatively small portion of the incoming voltage cycle.

Other examples of nonlinear loads are battery chargers, electronic ballasts, variable frequency drives, and switching mode power supplies.

== Interharmonics ==
The power industry had coined a term interharmonic to designate a variation of the AC power line voltage or current that is not a harmonic of the line ("fundamental") frequency. When analyzing a period of the fundamental frequency, an interharmonic appears to be a non-periodic distortion of the power system waveform. An interharmonic with a frequency less than the fundamental is called a subharmonic. The main sources of interharmonics are cycloconverters and arcing loads (arc welders and arc furnaces).

== See also ==
- Power factor

== Sources ==
- Gunther, E.W. (2001). Interharmonics in power systems. 2001 Power Engineering Society Summer Meeting. Conference Proceedings (Cat. No.01CH37262). Vol. 2. IEEE. pp. 813–817. doi:10.1109/PESS.2001.970156. ISBN 978-0-7803-7173-6.
- Marz, Michael B. (November 9, 2016). Interharmonics: What They Are, Where They Come From and What They Do (PDF). MIPSYCON. Archived from the original (PDF) on 27 July 2024., see also an article version at
