= Modulation transformer =

A modulation transformer is an audio-frequency transformer that forms a major part of most AM transmitters. The primary winding of a modulation transformer is fed by an audio amplifier that has about 1/2 of the rated input power of the transmitter's final amplifier stage. The secondary winding is in series with the power supply of that final radio-frequency amplifier stage, thereby allowing the audio signal to lower and raise the instantaneous DC supply voltage of the power amplifier (PA) tube or transistor. Considering that the PA device is operated as a class-C amplifier, i.e. as a switch, the modulation transformer is responsible for the amplitude modulation (AM) of the transmitter. There Is only one system of modulation that can be used without the modulation transformer with high power. "This is loop modulation"
