= Capacitor-input filter =

Type of filter

A capacitor-input filter is a filter circuit in which the first element is a capacitor connected in parallel with the output of the rectifier in a linear power supply. The capacitor increases the DC voltage and decreases the ripple voltage components of the output. The capacitor is often referred to as a smoothing capacitor or reservoir capacitor. The capacitor is often followed by other alternating series and parallel filter elements to further reduce ripple voltage, or adjust DC output voltage. It may also be followed by a voltage regulator which virtually eliminates any remaining ripple voltage, and adjusts the DC voltage output very precisely to match the DC voltage required by the circuit.

== Operation ==
While during the time the rectifier is conducting and the potential is higher than the charge across the capacitor, the capacitor will store energy from the transformer; when the output of the rectifier falls below the charge on the capacitor, the capacitor will discharge energy into the circuit. Since the rectifier conducts current only in the forward direction, any energy discharged by the capacitor will flow into the load. This results in output of a DC voltage upon which is superimposed a waveform referred to as a sawtooth wave. The sawtooth wave is a convenient linear approximation to the actual waveform, which is exponential for both charge and discharge. The crests of the sawtooth waves will be more rounded when the DC resistance of the transformer secondary is higher.

== Ripple current ==
A ripple current which is 90 degrees out of phase with the ripple voltage also passes through the capacitor.

== See also ==
- Rectifier#Capacitor input filter
- Choke-input filter
