= DC injection braking =

Method of slowing AC electric motors

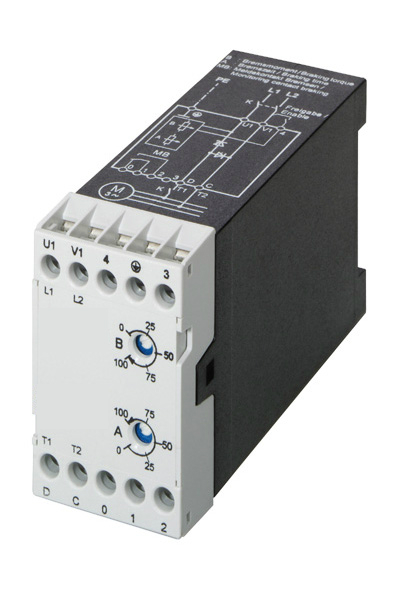
DC injection brake module

DC injection braking is a method of slowing AC electric motors. Direct Current is injected into the winding of the AC motor after the AC voltage is disconnected, providing braking force to the rotor.

== Applications of DC injection braking ==
When power is disconnected from the motor, the rotor spins freely until friction slows it to a stop. Large rotors and loads with a high moment of inertia may take a significant amount of time to stop through internal friction alone. To reduce downtime, or possibly as an emergency safety feature, DC injection braking can be used to quickly stop the rotor.

A DC injection brake system can be used as an alternative or addition to a friction brake system. DC injection brakes only require a small module located with the other motor switchgear and/or drivers, mounted in a remote and convenient location, whereas a friction brake must be mounted somewhere on the rotating system. Friction brakes eventually wear out with use and require replacement of braking components. DC brake modules do not have consumable parts and should not require maintenance. Friction brakes also require a method of actuation, requiring either a human operator or system controlled actuator, adding to the complexity of the system. A DC brake is easily integrated into the motor control circuitry. However, motors that control hanging loads, such as an elevator or crane, require friction brakes as a primary stopping method to ensure the load is held securely.

== Operation ==
Half-wave rectification to supply DC current

Direct current is applied to the motor stator windings, creating a stationary magnetic field which applies a static torque to the rotor. This slows and eventually halts the rotor completely. As long as the DC voltage is applied to the windings, the rotor will be held in position and resistant to any attempt to spin it. The higher the voltage that is applied, the stronger the braking force and holding power. The current should only be applied for a few seconds or the motor will overheat.

In a thyristor-controlled injection braking unit, the voltage to be injected into the motor stator winding is obtained by rectifying the supply voltage. Two thyristors are connected as a phase controlled rectifier (PCR). The braking torque depends on the magnitude of the current, which can be varied by phase control of the thyristors. When the motor is switched off, the motor contactor relay not only disconnects the AC current supply to the motor windings, but also causes a braking relay contactor to close. This initiates a sequence beginning with a time delay of about 300ms that allows current still flowing in the motor windings to diminish to a safe level. Then, the thyristors begin firing to produce the braking current, which is set by a timer to continue for a few seconds, and then is switched off. The braking current decays, and after a delay of about 1.5 seconds the braking relay contactor opens again. At this point the motor can be restarted. In such a unit, there are typically two potentiometers, one to vary the braking torque from the firing circuit and the other to vary the timer. These settings are balanced so that braking torque does not exceed rated motor torque, but also the braking time must be limited to prevent motor overheating.

== See also ==
- Braking chopper
- Space vector modulation
- Variable-frequency drive
- Variable-speed air compressor
- Vector control (motor)
