= Variable-speed air compressor =

Air compressor using variable-speed drive technology

A variable-speed drive (VSD) air compressor is an air compressor that takes advantage of variable-speed drive technology. This type of compressor uses a special drive to control the speed (RPM) of the unit, which in turn saves energy compared to a fixed speed equivalent. This is done to improve the efficiency of the compressor as varying the displacement or compression ratio of a compressor generally introduces significant inefficiency, or is impractical to implement.

The most common form of VSD technology in the air compressor industry is a variable-frequency drive, which converts the incoming AC power to DC and then back to a quasi-sinusoidal AC power using an inverter switching circuit. The variable-frequency drive article provides additional information on electronic speed controls used with various types of AC motors.

== Benefits ==
The benefits of this technology included reducing power cost, reducing power surges (from starting AC motors), and delivering a more constant pressure. The down side of this technology is the heavy expense associated with the drive, and the sensitivity of these drives – specifically to heat and moisture.

== Industry ==
Typically a fifth of a factory's electricity bill is attributed to the production of compressed air. The majority of modern factories are heavily involved in cutting costs, and energy awareness should be a key concern. For example, 10–12% of all power generated in the UK is dedicated to the production of compressed air and a portion of this power is wasted energy.

Large electrical cost savings can be achieved by installing a variable speed drive compressor in place of an existing rotary screw or piston machine. Because of this, many governments, including the US and UK, are pushing the industries to move towards this technology in hopes of reducing wasted energy. Governments offer various incentives, such as tax rebates or interest free loans, to cover the upgrades.

However, variable speed drive compressors are not necessarily appropriate for all industrial applications. If a variable speed drive compressor operates continuously at full speed, the switching losses of the frequency converter result in a lower energy efficiency than an otherwise identically sized fixed speed compressor. Where demand remains constant within 5–15% of the total free air delivery flow rate, dual-control compressors configured in a split solution can provide higher efficiency than a VSD.

A professional air audit is the best way to identify if a VSD compressor is most appropriate for any given compressed air application. These audits are available from various companies that specialize in the implementation of compressed air equipment, which can determine the most efficient controls for a compressed air system – including variable speed, variable capacity or using storage and flow controllers.

== See also ==
- Variable-speed drive
- Variable-frequency drive (VFD)
- Rotary screw compressor
- Air compressor
