= Locomotive wheelslip =

Engineering phenomenon

Locomotive wheelslip is an event that affects railway motive power usually when starting from stationary, but can also affect an engine in motion.

== Overview ==
The greatest effort is required from a locomotive when starting. At this time, if the driver applies too much power to the wheels (i.e., for a steam locomotive, the driver opens the regulator too far) the turning force applied to the wheel will greatly exceed the opposing friction force affected by the surface of the rail, and the wheel will turn without being able to move the train forward. If the driver does not take quick corrective action (i.e. by closing the regulator) the locomotive can end up stationary with its wheels spinning: this can damage both the locomotive drive mechanism (through running too fast) and the rail surface, which, in extreme cases, can be left with a dip where the spin took place. Such a dip can be dangerous if not repaired.

Some locomotive types were more prone to this phenomenon than others. Also, the effect is much more likely to occur with a heavier train or where the rail surface is compromised, for example, during wet or icy weather, or when there is oil or leaves on the track.

== Causes ==
The causes of locomotive wheelslip vary, but the predominant factor lies in the power-to-weight ratios. Ideally, locomotive designs will have roughly equal power-to-weight ratios that enable smooth acceleration from a 'cold start', or stopping position. However, if the power of a locomotive vastly exceeds its weight, then an imbalance ensues which causes the violent spinning of the wheels through loss of traction.

Other causes include the contact of oil with the flanges and rims of wheels, which reduces adhesion with the surface of the rails, and a general loss of traction on steep gradients when pulling heavy loads.

== Alleviation ==
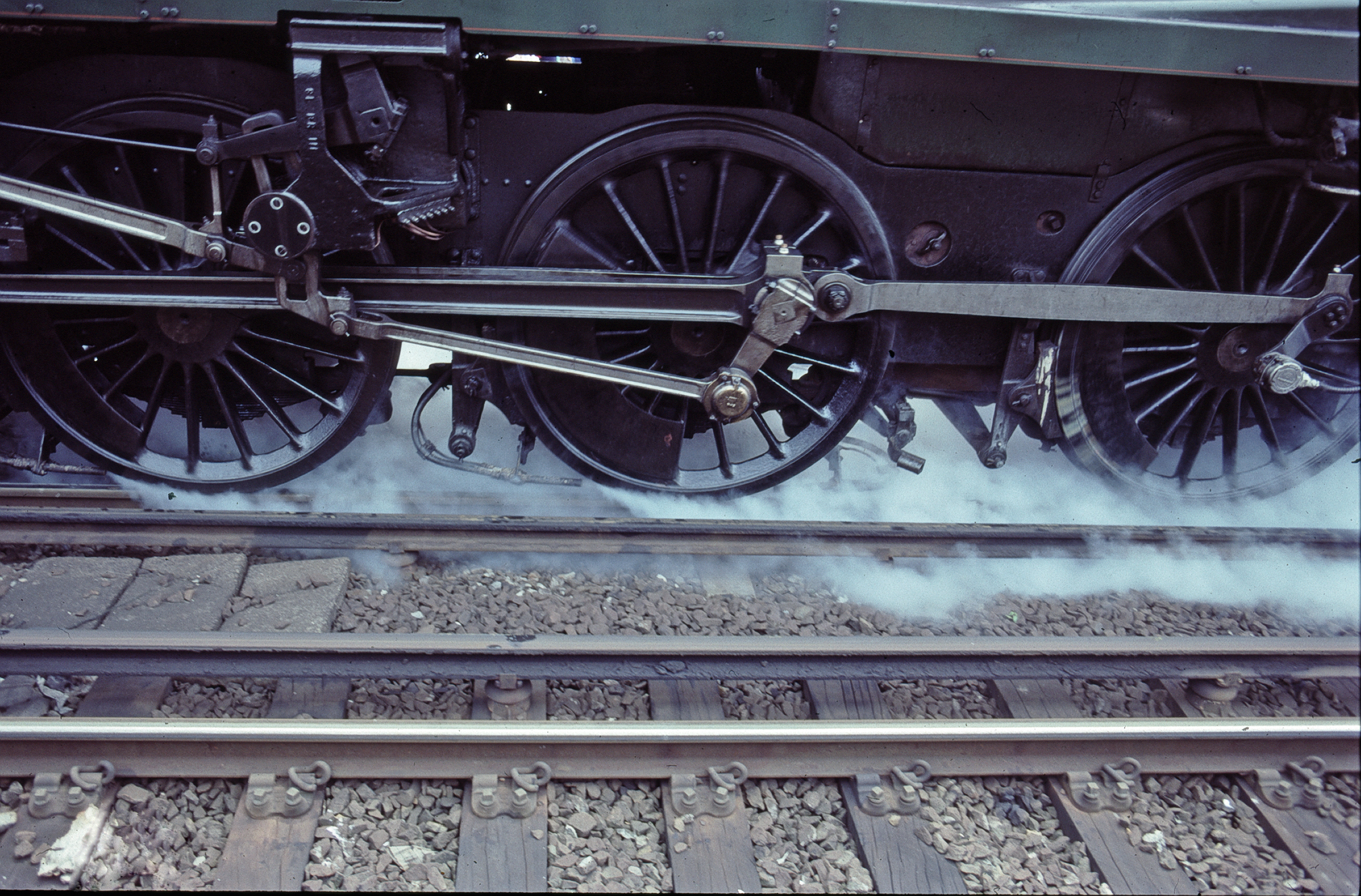
Steam sanders in use

Most locomotives are fitted with sandboxes, so that sand or Sandite can be dropped on the rails to improve adhesion. Modern diesel locomotives and electric locomotives are fitted with electronic wheelspin detectors which automatically reduce the power supplied to the wheels if wheelspin is detected.

== See also ==
- Slippery rail
