= Variable-frequency drive =

Type of adjustable-speed drive

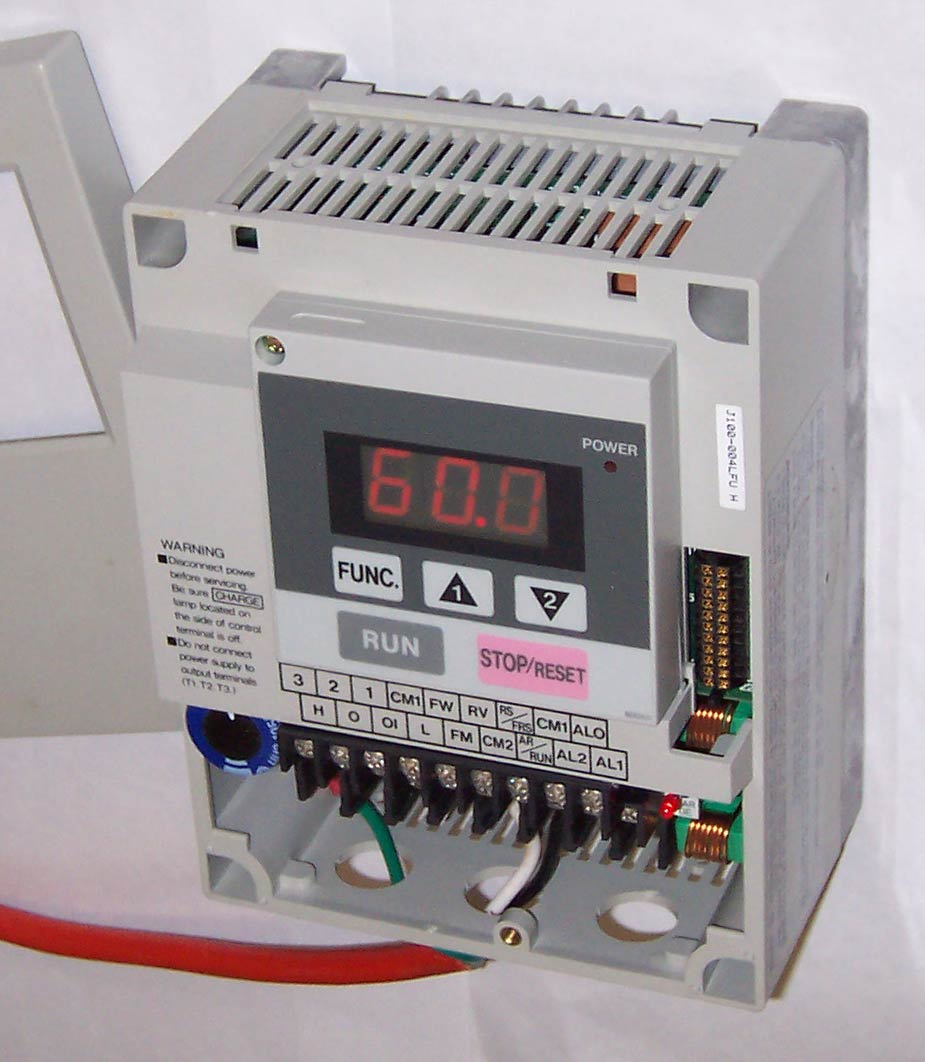
Small variable-frequency drive

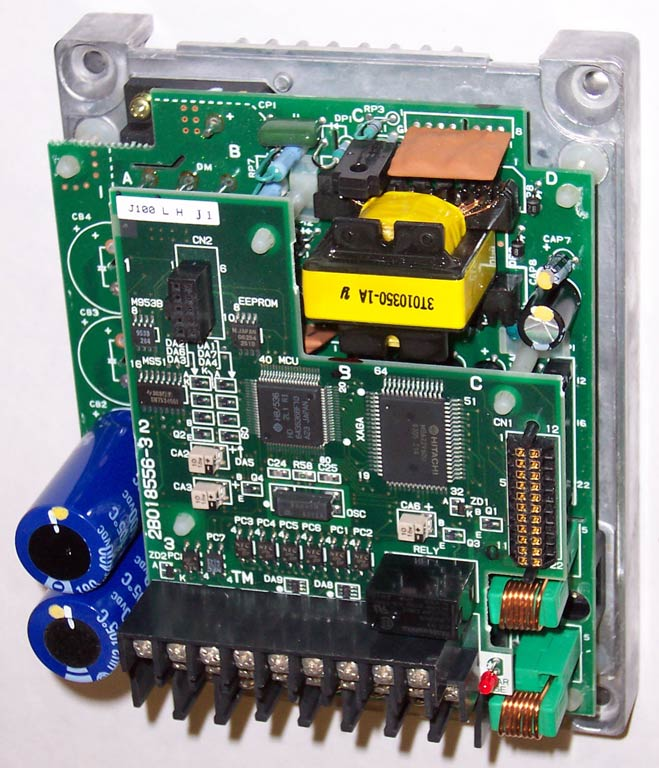
Chassis of above VFD (cover removed)

A variable-frequency drive (VFD, or adjustable-frequency drive, adjustable-speed drive, variable-speed drive, AC drive, micro drive, inverter drive, variable voltage variable frequency drive, VVVF drive, or drive) is a type of AC motor drive (system incorporating a motor) that controls speed and torque by varying the frequency of the input electricity. Depending on its topology, it controls the associated voltage or current variation.

VFDs are used in applications ranging from small appliances to large compressors. Systems using VFDs can be more efficient than hydraulic systems, such as in systems with pumps and damper control for fans.

Since the 1980s, power electronics technology has reduced VFD cost and size and has improved performance through advances in semiconductor switching devices, drive topologies, simulation and control techniques, and control hardware and software.

VFDs include low- and medium-voltage AC–AC and DC–AC topologies.

== History ==
Pulse-width modulation (PWM) variable-frequency drive projects started in the 1960s at Strömberg in Finland. Martti Harmoinen is regarded as the inventor of this technology. Strömberg managed to sell the idea of PWM drive to Helsinki Metro in 1973 and in 1982 the first PWM drive SAMI10 were operational.

== System description and operation ==
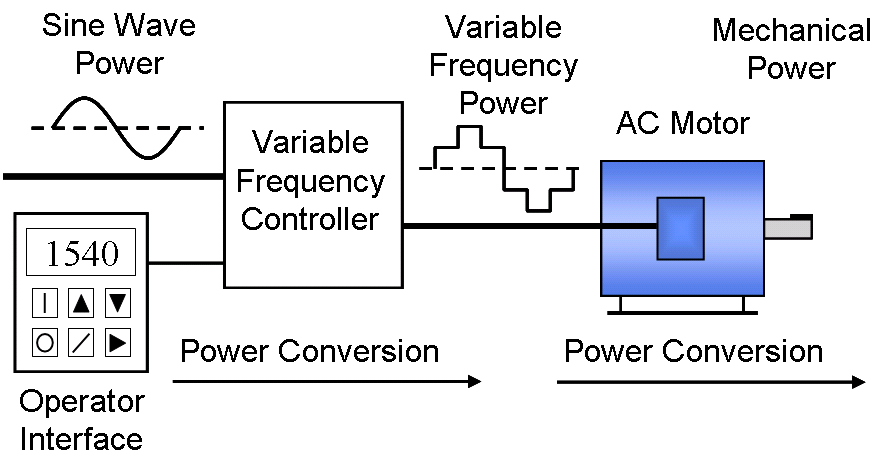
VFD system

A variable-frequency drive is a device used in a drive system consisting of the following three main sub-systems: AC motor, main drive controller assembly, and drive/operator interface.

=== AC motor ===
The AC electric motor used in a VFD system is usually a three-phase induction motor. Some types of single-phase motors or synchronous motors can be advantageous in some situations, but generally three-phase induction motors are preferred as the most economical. Motors that are designed for fixed-speed operation are often used. Elevated-voltage stresses imposed on induction motors that are supplied by VFDs require that such motors be designed for definite-purpose inverter-fed duty in accordance with such requirements as Part 31 of NEMA Standard MG-1.

=== Controller ===
The VFD controller is a solid-state power electronics conversion system consisting of three distinct sub-systems: a rectifier bridge converter, a direct current (DC) link, and an inverter. Voltage-source inverter (VSI) drives (see 'Generic topologies' sub-section below) are by far the most common type of drives. Most drives are AC–AC drives in that they convert AC line input to AC inverter output. However, in some applications such as common DC bus or solar applications, drives are configured as DC–AC drives. The most basic rectifier converter for the VSI drive is configured as a three-phase, six-pulse, full-wave diode bridge. In a VSI drive, the DC link consists of a capacitor which smooths out the converter's DC output ripple and provides a stiff input to the inverter. This filtered DC voltage is converted to quasi-sinusoidal AC voltage output using the inverter's active switching elements. VSI drives provide higher power factor and lower harmonic distortion than phase-controlled current-source inverter (CSI) and load-commutated inverter (LCI) drives (see 'Generic topologies' sub-section below). The drive controller can also be configured as a phase converter having single-phase converter input and three-phase inverter output.

Controller advances have exploited dramatic increases in the voltage and current ratings and switching frequency of solid-state power devices over the past six decades. Introduced in 1983, the insulated-gate bipolar transistor (IGBT) has in the past two decades come to dominate VFDs as an inverter switching device.

In variable-torque applications suited for Volts-per-Hertz (V/Hz) drive control, AC motor characteristics require that the voltage magnitude of the inverter's output to the motor be adjusted to match the required load torque in a linear V/Hz relationship. For example, for 460 V, 60 Hz motors, this linear V/Hz relationship is 460/60 = 7.67 V/Hz. While suitable in wide-ranging applications, V/Hz control is sub-optimal in high-performance applications involving low speed or demanding, dynamic speed regulation, positioning, and reversing load requirements. Some V/Hz control drives can also operate in quadratic V/Hz mode or can even be programmed to suit special multi-point V/Hz paths.

The two other drive control platforms, vector control and direct torque control (DTC), adjust the motor voltage magnitude, angle from reference, and frequency so as to precisely control the motor's magnetic flux and mechanical torque.

Although space vector pulse-width modulation (SVPWM) is becoming increasingly popular, sinusoidal PWM (SPWM) is the most straightforward method used to vary drives' motor voltage (or current) and frequency. With SPWM control (see Fig. 1), quasi-sinusoidal, variable-pulse-width output is constructed from intersections of a saw-toothed carrier signal with a modulating sinusoidal signal which is variable in operating frequency as well as in voltage (or current).

Operation of the motors above rated nameplate speed (base speed) is possible, but is limited to conditions that do not require more power than the nameplate rating of the motor. This is sometimes called "field weakening" and, for AC motors, means operating at less than rated V/Hz and above rated nameplate speed. Permanent magnet synchronous motors have quite limited field-weakening speed range due to the constant magnet flux linkage. Wound-rotor synchronous motors and induction motors have much wider speed range. For example, a 100 HP, 460 V, 60 Hz, 1775 RPM (4-pole) induction motor supplied with 460 V, 75 Hz (6.134 V/Hz), would be limited to 60/75 = 80% torque at 125% speed (2218.75 RPM) = 100% power. At higher speeds, the induction motor torque has to be limited further due to the lowering of the breakaway torque (Note: NEMA Guide defines a motor's breakaway torque as 'The torque that a motor produces at zero speed when operating on a control', and a motor's breakdown torque as 'The maximum torque that it will develop with rated voltage applied at rated frequency on sinewave power, without an abrupt drop in speed.') of the motor. Thus, rated power can be typically produced only up to 130–150% of the rated nameplate speed. Wound-rotor synchronous motors can be run at even higher speeds. In rolling mill drives, often 200–300% of the base speed is used. The mechanical strength of the rotor limits the maximum speed of the motor.

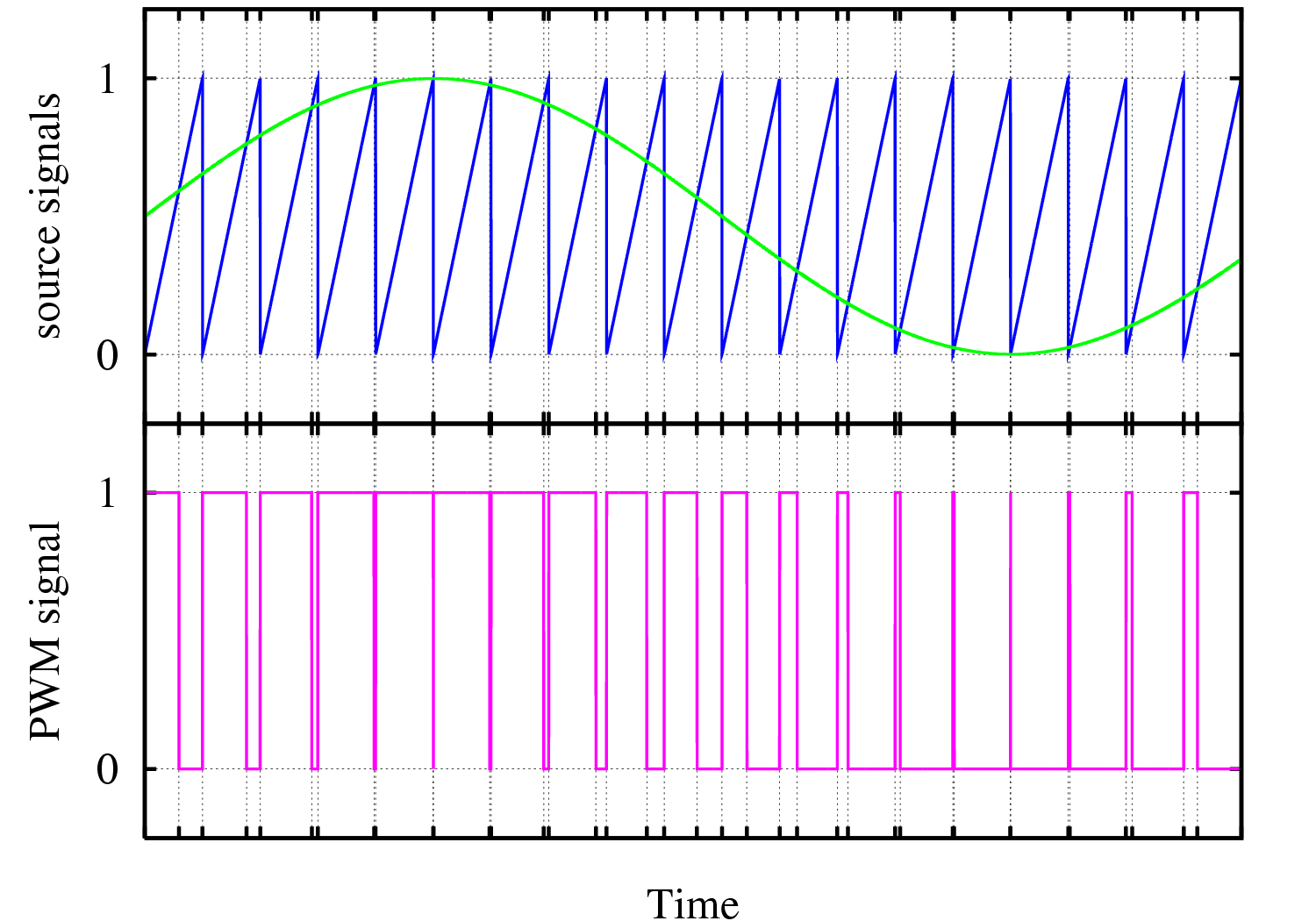
Fig. 1: SPWM carrier-sine input & 2-level PWM output

An embedded microprocessor governs the overall operation of the VFD controller. Basic programming of the microprocessor is provided as user-inaccessible firmware. User programming of display, variable, and function block parameters is provided to control, protect, and monitor the VFD, motor, and driven equipment.

The basic drive controller can be configured to selectively include such optional power components and accessories as follows:

- Connected upstream of converter – circuit breaker or fuses, isolation contactor, EMC filter, line reactor, passive filter
- Connected to DC link – braking chopper, braking resistor
- Connected downstream of inverter—output reactor, sine wave filter, dV/dt filter. (Note: The mathematical symbol dV/dt, defined as the derivative of voltage V with respect to time t, provides a measure of rate of voltage rise, the maximum admissible value of which expresses the capability of capacitors, motors, and other affected circuit elements to withstand high current or voltage spikes due to fast voltage changes; dV/dt is usually expressed in V/microsecond.)

=== Operator interface ===
The operator interface provides a means for an operator to start and stop the motor and adjust the operating speed. The VFD may also be controlled by a programmable logic controller through Modbus or another similar interface. Additional operator control functions might include reversing, and switching between manual speed adjustment and automatic control from an external process control signal. The operator interface often includes an alphanumeric display or indication lights and meters to provide information about the operation of the drive. An operator interface keypad and display unit is often provided on the front of the VFD controller as shown in the photograph above. The keypad display can often be cable-connected and mounted a short distance from the VFD controller. Most are also provided with input and output (I/O) terminals for connecting push buttons, switches, and other operator interface devices or control signals. A serial communications port is also often available to allow the VFD to be configured, adjusted, monitored, and controlled using a computer.

=== Speed control ===
There are two main ways to control the speed of a VFD; networked or hardwired. Networked involves transmitting the intended speed over a communication protocol such as Modbus, Modbus/TCP, EtherNet/IP, or via a keypad using Display Serial Interface while hardwired involves a pure electrical means of communication. Typical means of hardwired communication are: 4–20mA current signals, 0–10 V DC, or using the internal 24 V DC power supply with a potentiometer. Speed control can be performed either remotely or locally, depending on the application's requirements. Remote control instructs the VFD to ignore speed commands from the keypad while local control instructs the VFD to ignore external control and only abide by the keypad.

=== Programming a VFD ===
Depending on the model a VFD's operating parameters can be programmed via: dedicated programming software, internal keypad, external keypad, or SD card. VFDs will often block out most programming changes while running. Typical parameters that need to be set include: motor nameplate information, speed reference source, on/off control source and braking control. It is also common for VFDs to provide debugging information such as fault codes and the states of the input signals.

== Starting and software behavior ==
Most VFDs allow auto-starting, which will drive the output to a designated frequency after a power cycle, after a fault has been cleared, or after the emergency stop signal has been restored (generally emergency stops are active low logic). One popular way to control a VFD is to enable auto-start and place L1, L2, and L3 into a contactor. Powering on the contactor thus turns on the drive and has it output to a designated speed. Depending on the sophistication of the drive multiple auto-starting behavior can be developed e.g. the drive auto-starts on power up but does not auto-start from clearing an emergency stop until a reset has been cycled.

=== Drive operation ===
Electric motor speed-torque chart

Referring to the accompanying chart, drive applications can be categorized as single-quadrant, two-quadrant, or four-quadrant; the chart's four quadrants are defined as follows:

- Quadrant I – Driving or motoring, forward accelerating quadrant with positive speed and torque
- Quadrant II – Generating or braking, forward braking-decelerating quadrant with positive speed and negative torque
- Quadrant III – Driving or motoring, reverse accelerating quadrant with negative speed and torque
- Quadrant IV – Generating or braking, reverse braking-decelerating quadrant with negative speed and positive torque.

Most applications involve single-quadrant loads operating in quadrant I, such as in variable-torque (e.g. centrifugal pumps or fans) and certain constant-torque (e.g. extruders) loads.

Certain applications involve two-quadrant loads operating in quadrant I and II where the speed is positive but the torque changes polarity as in case of a fan decelerating faster than natural mechanical losses. Some sources define two-quadrant drives as loads operating in quadrants I and III where the speed and torque is same (positive or negative) polarity in both directions.

Certain high-performance applications involve four-quadrant loads (Quadrants I to IV) where the speed and torque can be in any direction such as in hoists, elevators, and hilly conveyors. Regeneration can occur only in the drive's DC link bus when inverter voltage is smaller in magnitude than the motor back-EMF and inverter voltage and back-EMF are the same polarity.

In starting a motor, a VFD initially applies a low frequency and voltage, thus avoiding high inrush-current associated with direct-on-line starting. After the start of the VFD, the applied frequency and voltage are increased at a controlled rate or ramped up to accelerate the load. This starting method typically allows a motor to develop 150% of its rated torque while the VFD is drawing less than 50% of its rated current from the mains in the low-speed range. A VFD can be adjusted to produce a steady 150% starting torque from standstill right up to full speed. However, motor cooling deteriorates and can result in overheating as speed decreases such that prolonged low-speed operation with significant torque is not usually possible without separately motorized fan ventilation.

With a VFD, the stopping sequence is just the opposite as the starting sequence. The frequency and voltage applied to the motor are ramped down at a controlled rate. When the frequency approaches zero, the motor is shut off. A small amount of braking torque is available to help decelerate the load a little faster than it would stop if the motor were simply switched off and allowed to coast. Additional braking torque can be obtained by adding a braking circuit (resistor controlled by a transistor) to dissipate the braking energy. With a four-quadrant rectifier (active front-end), the VFD is able to brake the load by applying a reverse torque and injecting the energy back to the AC line.

== Benefits ==
=== Energy savings ===
Many fixed-speed motor load applications that are supplied direct from AC line power can save energy when they are operated at variable speed by means of VFD. Such energy cost savings are especially pronounced in variable-torque centrifugal fan and pump applications, where the load's torque and power vary with the square and cube, respectively, of the speed. This change gives a large power reduction compared to fixed-speed operation for a relatively small reduction in speed. For example, at 63% speed a motor load consumes only 25% of its full-speed power. This reduction is in accordance with affinity laws that define the relationship between various centrifugal load variables.

In the United States, an estimated 60–65% of electrical energy is used to supply motors, 75% of which are variable-torque fan, pump, and compressor loads. Eighteen percent of the energy used in the 40 million motors in the U.S. could be saved by efficient energy improvement technologies such as VFDs.

Only about 3% of the total installed base of AC motors are provided with AC drives. However, it is estimated that drive technology is adopted in as many as 30–40% of all newly installed motors.

An energy consumption breakdown of the global population of AC motor installations is as shown in the following table:

Global population of motors, 2009
	Small	General purpose Medium-size	Large
Power	10 W – 750 W	0.75 kW – 375 kW	375 kW – 10000 kW
Phase, voltage	1-ph., <240 V	3-ph., 200 V – 1 kV	3-ph., 1 kV – 20 kV
% total motor energy	9%	68%	23%
Total stock	2 billion	230 million	0.6 million

=== Control performance ===
AC drives are used to bring about process and quality improvements in industrial and commercial applications' acceleration, flow, monitoring, pressure, speed, temperature, tension, and torque.

Fixed-speed loads subject the motor to a high starting torque and to current surges that are up to eight times the full-load current. AC drives instead gradually ramp the motor up to operating speed to lessen mechanical and electrical stress, reducing maintenance and repair costs, and extending the life of the motor and the driven equipment.

Variable-speed drives can also run a motor in specialized patterns to further minimize mechanical and electrical stress. For example, an S-curve pattern can be applied to a conveyor application for smoother deceleration and acceleration control, which reduces the backlash that can occur when a conveyor is accelerating or decelerating.

Performance factors tending to favor the use of DC drives over AC drives include such requirements as continuous operation at low speed, four-quadrant operation with regeneration, frequent acceleration and deceleration routines, and need for the motor to be protected for a hazardous area. The following table compares AC and DC drives according to certain key parameters:

Drive type	DC	AC VFD	AC VFD	AC VFD	AC VFD
Control platform	Brush type DC	V/Hz control	Vector control	Vector control	Vector control
Control criteria	Closed-loop	Open-loop	Open-loop	Closed-loop	Open-loop w. HFI^
Motor	DC	IM	IM	IM	Interior PM
Typical speed regulation (%)	0.01	1	0.5	0.01	0.02
Typical speed range at constant torque (%)	0–100	10–100	3–100	0–100	0–100
Min. speed at 100% torque (% of base)	Standstill	8%	2%	Standstill	Standstill (200%)
Multiple-motor operation recommended	No	Yes	No	No	No
Fault protection (Fused only or inherent to drive)	Fused only	Inherent	Inherent	Inherent	Inherent
Maintenance	(Brushes)	Low	Low	Low	Low
Feedback device	Tachometer or encoder	N/A	N/A	Encoder	N/A

^ High-frequency injection

== VFD types and ratings ==
=== Generic topologies ===
Topology of VSI drive

Topology of CSI drive

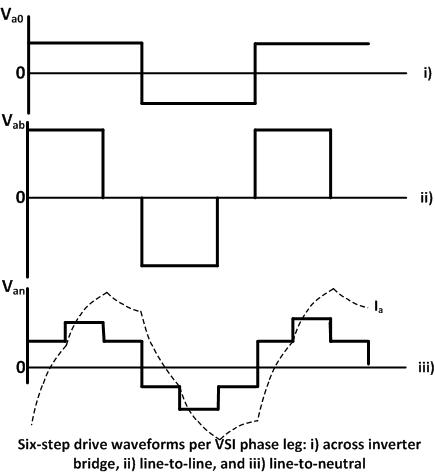
Six-step drive waveforms

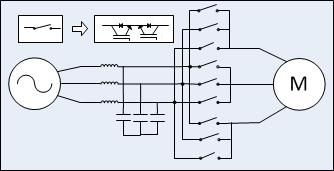
Topology of direct matrix converter

AC drives can be classified according to the following generic topologies: (Note: A topology is defined in power electronics parlance as the relationship between AC drives' various elements.)

- Voltage-source inverter (VSI) drive topologies (see image): In a VSI drive, the DC output of the diode-bridge converter stores energy in the capacitor bus to supply stiff voltage input to the inverter. The vast majority of drives are VSI type with PWM voltage output. (Note: The term PWM is often used to mean VSI-PWM, which is misleading as not only VSI drives are with PWM output.)
- Current-source inverter (CSI) drive topologies (see image): In a CSI drive, the DC output of the SCR-bridge converter stores energy in series-Inductor connection to supply stiff current input to the inverter. CSI drives can be operated with either PWM or six-step waveform output.
- Six-step inverter drive topologies (see image): (Note: The term six-step refers strictly speaking to an inverter waveform output alternative to PWM, some drives being configured as combined six-step and PWM options.) Now largely obsolete, six-step drives can be either VSI or CSI type and are also referred to as variable-voltage inverter drives, pulse-amplitude modulation (PAM) drives, square-wave drives or DC chopper inverter drives. In a six-step drive, the DC output of the SCR-bridge converter is smoothed via capacitor bus and series-reactor connection to supply via Darlington Pair or IGBT inverter quasi-sinusoidal, six-step voltage or current input to an induction motor.
- Load commutated inverter (LCI) drive topologies: In an LCI drive (a special CSI case), the DC output of the SCR-bridge converter stores energy via DC link inductor circuit to supply stiff quasi-sinusoidal six-step current output of a second SCR-bridge's inverter and an over-excited synchronous machine. Low-cost SCR-thyristor-based LCI fed synchronous motor drives are often used in high-power low-dynamic-performance fan, pump and compressor applications rated up to 100 MW.
- Cycloconverter or matrix converter (MC) topologies (see image): Cycloconverters and MCs are AC–AC converters that have no intermediate DC link for energy storage. A cycloconverter operates as a three-phase current source via three anti-parallel-connected SCR-bridges in six-pulse configuration, each cycloconverter phase acting selectively to convert fixed line-frequency AC voltage to an alternating voltage at a variable load frequency. MC drives are IGBT-based.
- Doubly-fed slip recovery system topologies: A doubly-fed slip recovery system feeds rectified slip power to a smoothing reactor to supply power to the AC supply network via an inverter, the speed of the motor being controlled by adjusting the DC current.

=== Control platforms ===
Most drives use one or more of the following control platforms:

- Scalar control
- Vector control (VC)
  - Field-oriented control (FOC)
- Direct torque control (DTC)

=== Load torque and power characteristics ===
Variable-frequency drives are also categorized by the following load torque and power characteristics:

- Variable torque, such as in centrifugal fan, pump, and blower applications
- Constant torque, such as in conveyor and positive-displacement pump applications
- Constant power, such as in machine tool and traction applications.

=== Available power ratings ===
VFDs are available with voltage and current ratings covering a wide range of single-phase and multi-phase AC motors. Low-voltage (LV) drives are designed to operate at output voltages equal to or less than 690 V. While motor-application LV drives are available in ratings of up to the order of 5 or 6 MW, economic considerations typically favor medium-voltage (MV) drives with much lower power ratings. Different MV drive topologies (see Table 2) are configured in accordance with the voltage/current-combination ratings used in different drive controllers' switching devices such that any given voltage rating is greater than or equal to one to the following standard nominal motor voltage ratings: generally either 2 3/4.16 kV (60 Hz) or 3 3/6.6 kV (50 Hz), with one thyristor manufacturer rated for up to 12 kV switching. In some applications a step-up transformer is placed between a LV drive and a MV motor load. MV drives are typically rated for motor applications greater than between about 375 and 750 kW (503 and 1,006 hp). MV drives have historically required considerably more application design effort than required for LV drive applications. The power rating of MV drives can reach 100 MW (130,000 hp), a range of different drive topologies being involved for different rating, performance, power quality, and reliability requirements.

=== Drives by machines and detailed topologies ===
It is lastly useful to relate VFDs in terms of the following two classifications:

- In terms of various AC machines as shown in Table 1 below
- In terms of various detailed AC–AC converter topologies shown in Tables 2 and 3 below.
Table 1: Drives by machines

- Machines
  - Induction^^^
    - Cage rotor
      - CSI or VSI (six-step or PWM), cycloconverter, matrix
    - WRIM
      - Electro-mechanical
    - Doubly fed WRIM
      - Slip energy recovery (Kramer/Scherbius)
  - Synchronous^^^
    - WFSM
      - CSI (LCI), cycloconverter, VSI
    - PM
      - Axial or disk
      - Radial
        - Interior
        - Surface
          - Trapezoidal BLDM, Sinusoidal PMSM
            - VSI
    - SyRM
      - VSI
  - VRM^^^
    - Switched reluctance motor, Stepper motor
      - VSI

Table 2: Drives by detailed AC–AC converter topologies

- Topologies
- Indirect AC–AC
  - LV
    - IGBT^
      - 2-level VSI PWM
        - Great majority of LV drive makes
      - 3-level VSI PWM
        - Primarily Yaskawa
    - (SCR/CSI or diode/VSI)+IGBT
      - Six-step or PAM
        - For example Baker-Hughes
  - MV
    - VSI
      - GCT^
        - 3‑level NPC inverter
          - Primarily ABB, GE
      - IGBT^
        - 2‑level inverter
          - Primarily GE-Converteam
        - 3‑level NPC inverter
          - Primarily Eaton, GE-Toshiba, Siemens
        - Multilevel CHB inverter
          - Primarily GE, Siemens (Robicon), Toshiba
        - Flying‑capacitor inverter drive
          - Primarily GE-Converteam
        - NPC/H‑bridge inverter drive
          - Primarily Toshiba
    - CSI
      - Primarily ABB, GE‑Converteam, Siemens
        - SCR^^
          - LCI
      - Primarily Allen‑Bradley
        - SGCT^^ with AFE
          - CSR PWM / CSI PWM inverter with CME
        - SCR + SGCT
          - 18-pulse CSI PWM drive
        - GTO^^
          - Capacitor assisted CSI PWM drive (legacy)
- Direct AC–AC
  - SCR
    - Cycloconverter
      - Primarily ABB, Siemens, GE Converteam
  - IGBT
    - Matrix
      - Primarily Yaskawa

Table 3: Topology diagrams
Simplified 2-Level Inverter Topology

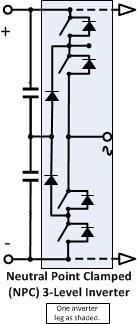
Simplified Neutral Point Clamped 3-Level Inverter Topology

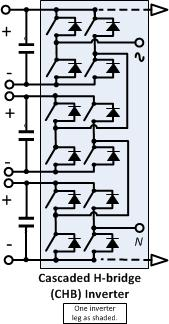
Simplified Cascaded H-bridge Inverter Topology

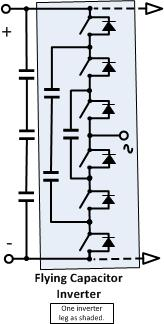
Simplified Flying Capacitor Inverter 4-Level Topology

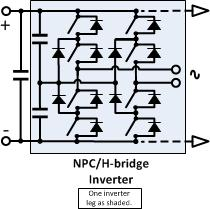
Simplified Neutral Point Clamped H-bridge Inverter Topology
Legend for Tables 1 to 3

^	Inverter switching device (with std. diode rectifier)
^^	Inverter and rectifier switching device
^^^	Rotating or linear
AFE	Active front end
BLDM	PM trapezoid machine (Brushless DC electric motor)
CME	Common mode elimination
CHB	Cascaded H-bridge
CSI	Current source inverter
CSR	Current source rectifier
GCT	Gate-controlled thyristor
GTO	Gate turn-off thyristor
IGBT	Insulated gate bipolar transistor
LCI	Load commutated inverter
LV	Low voltage
MV	Medium voltage
NPC	Neutral point clamped
PAM	Pulse-amplitude modulation
PM	Permanent magnet
PMSM	Permanent magnet synchronous generator
PWM	Pulse-width modulation
SCR	Silicon-controlled rectifier
SGCT	Symmetrical gate controlled thyristor
SRM	Switched reluctance motor
SyRM	Synchronous reluctance machine
VRM	Variable-reluctance machine
VSI	Voltage source inverter
VVI	Variable-voltage inverter
WFSM	Wound-field synchronous machine
WRIM	Wound-rotor induction motor

== Application considerations ==
=== AC line harmonics ===
Note of clarification: (Note: The harmonics treatment that follows is limited for simplification reasons to LV VSI-PWM drives.)

While harmonics in the PWM output can easily be filtered by carrier-frequency-related filter inductance to supply near-sinusoidal currents to the motor load, the VFD's diode-bridge rectifier converts AC line voltage to DC voltage output by super-imposing non-linear half-phase current pulses thus creating harmonic current distortion, and hence voltage distortion, of the AC line input. When the VFD loads are relatively small in comparison to the large, stiff power system available from the electric power company, the effects of VFD harmonic distortion of the AC grid can often be within acceptable limits. Furthermore, in low-voltage networks, harmonics caused by single-phase equipment such as computers and TVs are partially cancelled by three-phase diode bridge harmonics because their 5th and 7th harmonics are in counterphase. However, when the proportion of VFD and other non-linear load compared to total load or of non-linear load compared to the stiffness at the AC power supply, or both, is relatively large enough, the load can have a negative impact on the AC power waveform available to other power company customers in the same grid.

When the power company's voltage becomes distorted due to harmonics, losses in other loads such as normal fixed-speed AC motors are increased. This condition may lead to overheating and shorter operating life. Also, substation transformers and compensation capacitors are affected negatively. In particular, capacitors can cause resonance conditions that can unacceptably magnify harmonic levels. To limit the voltage distortion, owners of VFD load may be required to install filtering equipment to reduce harmonic distortion below acceptable limits. Alternatively, the utility may adopt a solution by installing filtering equipment of its own at substations affected by the large amount of VFD equipment being used. In high-power installations, harmonic distortion can be reduced by supplying multi-pulse rectifier-bridge VFDs from transformers with multiple phase-shifted windings.

It is also possible to replace the standard diode-bridge rectifier with a bi-directional IGBT switching device bridge mirroring the standard inverter which uses IGBT switching device output to the motor. Such rectifiers are referred to by various designations including active infeed converter (AIC), active rectifier, IGBT supply unit (ISU), active front end (AFE), or four-quadrant operation. With PWM control and a suitable input reactor, an AFE's AC line current waveform can be nearly sinusoidal. AFE inherently regenerates energy in four-quadrant mode from the DC side to the AC grid. Thus, no braking resistor is needed, and the efficiency of the drive is improved if the drive is frequently required to brake the motor.

Two other harmonics mitigation techniques exploit use of passive or active filters connected to a common bus with at least one VFD branch load on the bus. Passive filters involve the design of one or more low-pass LC filter traps, each trap being tuned as required to a harmonic frequency (5th, 7th, 11th, 13th, . . . kq±1, where k=integer, q=pulse number of converter).

It is very common practice for power companies or their customers to impose harmonic distortion limits based on IEC or IEEE standards. For example, IEEE Standard 519 limits at the customer's connection point call for the maximum individual frequency voltage harmonic to be no more than 3% of the fundamental and call for the voltage total harmonic distortion (THD) to be no more than 5% for a general AC power supply system.

=== Switching frequency foldback ===
One drive uses a default switching frequency setting of 4 kHz. Reducing the drive's switching frequency (the carrier-frequency) reduces the heat generated by the IGBTs.

A carrier frequency of at least ten times the desired output frequency is used to establish the PWM switching intervals. A carrier frequency in the range of 2,000 to 16,000 Hz is common for LV [low voltage, under 600 Volts AC] VFDs. A higher carrier frequency produces a better sine wave approximation but incurs higher switching losses in the IGBT, decreasing the overall power conversion efficiency.

=== Noise smoothing ===
Some drives have a noise smoothing feature that can be turned on to introduce a random or periodic variation to the switching frequency. These techniques are known as randomized-carrier frequency modulation, randomized pulse-position modulation, and periodic carrier frequency modulation. This distributes the acoustic noise over a range of frequencies to lower the peak noise intensity.

=== Long-lead effects ===
The carrier-frequency pulsed output voltage of a PWM VFD causes rapid rise times in these pulses, the transmission line effects of which must be considered. Since the transmission-line impedance of the cable and motor are different, pulses tend to reflect back from the motor terminals into the cable. The resulting reflections can produce overvoltages equal to twice the DC bus voltage or up to 3.1 times the rated line voltage for long cable runs, putting high stress on the cable and motor windings, and eventual insulation failure. Insulation standards for three-phase motors rated 230 V or less adequately protect against such long-lead overvoltages. On 460 V or 575 V systems and inverters that use 3rd-generation IGBTs with a 0.1-microsecond rise time, the maximum recommended cable distance between VFD and motor is about 50 m or 150 feet. SiC MOSFETs have significantly faster turn-on and turn-off times than IGBTs, and significant overvoltages have been observed at cable lengths as short as 3 meters. Solutions to overvoltages caused by long lead lengths include minimizing cable length, lowering carrier frequency, installing dV/dt filters, using inverter-duty-rated motors (that are rated 600 V to withstand pulse trains with rise time less than or equal to 0.1 microsecond, of 1,600 V peak magnitude), and installing LCR low-pass sine wave filters. Selection of optimum PWM carrier frequency for AC drives involves balancing noise, heat, motor insulation stress, common-mode voltage-induced motor bearing current damage, smooth motor operation, and other factors. Further harmonics attenuation can be obtained by using an LCR low-pass sine wave filter or dV/dt filter.

=== Motor bearing currents ===
Carrier frequencies above 5 kHz are likely to cause bearing damage unless protective measures are taken.

PWM drives are inherently associated with high-frequency common-mode voltages and currents which may cause trouble with motor bearings. When these high-frequency voltages find a path to earth through a bearing, transfer of metal or electrical discharge machining (EDM) sparking occurs between the bearing's ball and the bearing's race. Over time, EDM-based sparking causes erosion in the bearing race that can be seen as a fluting pattern. In large motors, the stray capacitance of the windings provides paths for high-frequency currents that pass through the motor shaft ends, leading to a circulating type of bearing current. Poor grounding of motor stators can lead to shaft-to-ground bearing currents. Small motors with poorly grounded driven equipment are susceptible to high-frequency bearing currents.

Prevention of high-frequency bearing current damage uses three approaches: good cabling and grounding practices, interruption of bearing currents, and filtering or damping of common-mode currents through common mode chokes. Good cabling and grounding practices can include use of shielded, symmetrical-geometry power cable to supply the motor, installation of shaft grounding brushes, and conductive bearing grease. Bearing currents can be interrupted by installation of insulated bearings and specially designed electrostatic-shielded induction motors. Filtering and damping high-frequency bearing can be done though inserting soft magnetic cores over the three phases giving a high frequency impedance against the common mode or motor bearing currents. Another approach is to use instead of standard 2-level inverter drives, using either 3-level inverter drives or matrix converters.

=== Dynamic braking ===
Torque generated by the drive causes the induction motor to run at synchronous speed less the slip. If the load drives the motor faster than synchronous speed, the motor acts as a generator, converting mechanical power back to electrical power. This power is returned to the drive's DC link element (capacitor or reactor). A DC-link-connected electronic power switch or braking DC chopper controls dissipation of this power as heat in a set of resistors. Cooling fans may be used to prevent resistor overheating.

Dynamic braking wastes braking energy by transforming it to heat. By contrast, regenerative drives recover braking energy by injecting this energy into the AC line. The capital cost of regenerative drives is, however, relatively high.

=== Regenerative drives ===
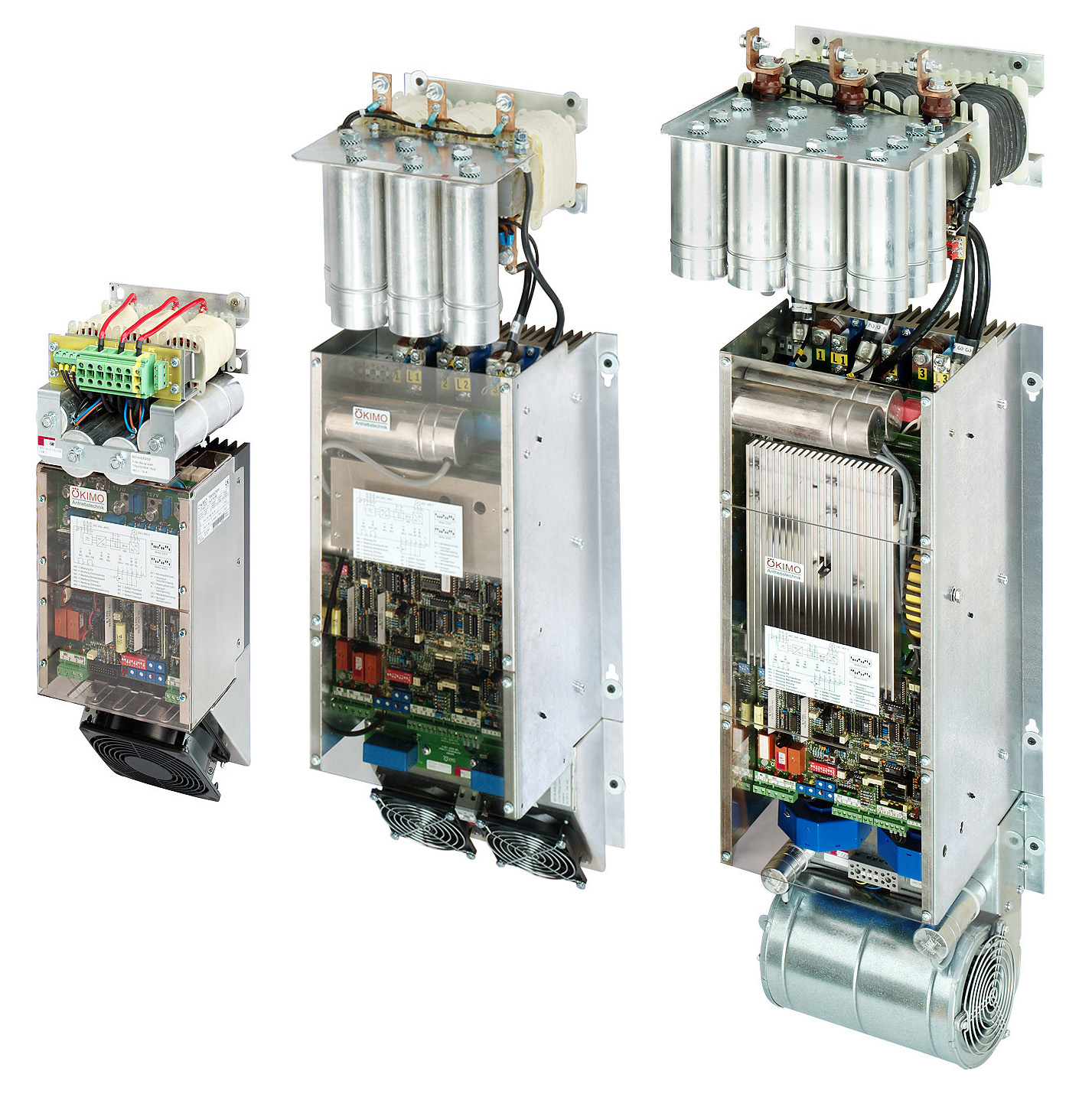
Line regenerative variable-frequency drives, showing capacitors (top cylinders) and inductors attached, which filter the regenerated power

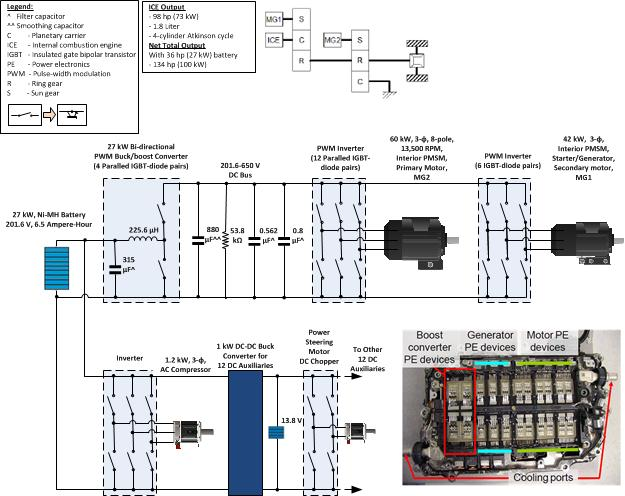
Simplified Drive Schematic for a Popular EHV

Regenerative AC drives have the capacity to recover the braking energy of a load moving faster than the designated motor speed (an overhauling load) and return it to the power system.

Cycloconverter, Scherbius, matrix, CSI, and LCI drives inherently allow return of energy from the load to the line, while voltage-source inverters require an additional converter to return energy to the supply.

Regeneration is useful in VFDs only where the value of the recovered energy is large compared to the extra cost of a regenerative system, and if the system requires frequent braking and starting. Regenerative VFDs are widely used where speed control of overhauling loads is required.

Some examples:

- Conveyor belt drives for manufacturing, which stop every few minutes. While stopped, parts are assembled; once that is done, the belt moves on.
- A crane, where the hoist motor stops and reverses frequently, and braking is required to slow the load during lowering.
- Plug-in and hybrid electric vehicles of all types (see image and Hybrid Synergy Drive).

== See also ==
- AC-to-AC converter
- Adjustable-speed drive
- Electronic speed control
- Frequency changer
- Vector control (motor)
