= Scalar control =

Scalar control of an AC electrical motor is a way to achieve the variable speed operation by manipulating the supply voltage or current ("magnitude") and the supply frequency while ignoring the magnetic field orientation inside the motor. Scalar control is based on equations valid for a steady-state operation and is frequently open-loop (no sensing except for the current limiter). The scalar control has been to a large degree replaced in high-performance motors by vector control that enables better handling of the transient processes. Low cost and simplicity keeps the scalar control in the majority of low-performance motors, despite inferiority of its dynamic performance; vector control is expected to become universal in the future.

== Types ==
The variants of the scalar control include open-loop control and closed-loop control.

=== Open-loop ===
The most common approach makes the voltage V proportional to frequency f (so called V/f control, V/Hz control, Constant Volts/Hertz, CVH). Advantage of the V/f variant is in keeping the magnetic flux inside the stator constant thus maintaining the motor performance across the range of speeds. A voltage boost at low frequencies is typically employed to compensate for the resistance of the coils.

An open-loop V/f control works well in applications with near-constant load torque and gradual changes in rotational speed. The controllers implementing this method are sometimes called general purpose AC drives.

=== Closed-loop ===
If sensors are utilized (closed-loop configuration) for better/faster transitional response, the common approach uses a rotational speed sensor (so called closed-loop V/Hz control). The speed error is passed through the proportional-integral controller to create the accumulated slip difference that is combined with the direct reading of the speed sensor into a frequency control signal.

In a torque-control variant (TC, not to be confused with the direct torque control a.k.a. DTC), the motor torque is held constant in the steady-state, this requires a current sensor. Frequency and flux (voltage or current, depending on the type of the drive) control signals are decoupled, with the flux control driven by the flux estimate, and the frequency control driven by the torque estimate and speed sensor data. The increased performance comes at the cost of additional complexity and associated potential stability issues.

== Sources ==
- Finch, John W.; Giaouris, Damian (2008). "Controlled AC Electrical Drives" (PDF). IEEE Transactions on Industrial Electronics. 55 (2). Institute of Electrical and Electronics Engineers (IEEE): 481–491. doi:10.1109/tie.2007.911209. ISSN 0278-0046.
- Buja, G.S.; Kazmierkowski, M.P. (2004). "Direct Torque Control of PWM Inverter-Fed AC Motors—A Survey". IEEE Transactions on Industrial Electronics. 51 (4). Institute of Electrical and Electronics Engineers (IEEE): 744–757. doi:10.1109/tie.2004.831717. ISSN 0278-0046.
- Trzynadlowski, A.M. (2013). "Scalar Control of Induction Motors". The Field Orientation Principle in Control of Induction Motors. Power Electronics and Power Systems. Springer US. ISBN 978-1-4615-2730-5.
- Chan, T.F.; Shi, K. (2011). "Scalar Control". Applied Intelligent Control of Induction Motor Drives. IEEE Press. Wiley. ISBN 978-0-470-82828-1.
- Bose, B.K. (2002). Modern Power Electronics and AC Drives (PDF). Eastern Economy Edition. Prentice Hall PTR. ISBN 978-0-13-016743-9.
- Bose, Bimal (2009). "The past, present, and future of power electronics [Guest Introduction]". IEEE Industrial Electronics Magazine. 3 (2). Institute of Electrical and Electronics Engineers (IEEE): 7–11, 14. doi:10.1109/mie.2009.932709. ISSN 1932-4529.
