= Torque ripple =

Torque ripple is an effect seen in rotating electrical machines, referring to a oscillation or pulsation of the average output torque as the electrical machines operates under steady states. The combination between the winding distributed in slots as a discrete magnetomotive-force source (electric loading) and the rotation-dependent magnetic reluctance (including the magnetic saturation, rotor and stator reluctances) is the main reason of the torque ripple. It is usual to evaluate the torque ripple as the difference in maximum and minimum torque over one complete revolution from measurements or calculations, generally expressed as a percentage per operating point (specific speed and mean torque). Due to the torque ripple, the speed of the shaft will oscillate as well, as the entire mechanical load on the test bench will expose the oscillations of mechanical and electrical power.

== Examples ==
A common example under no load is "cogging torque" due to slotting and saliency effects of the stator and rotor cores, which causes variations in the magnetic reluctance depending on the rotor position.

Usually, for smooth operations, a reduced value of torque ripple is required and acceptable. However, for specific applications, such as electric impact wrenches, a higher torque ripple has some advantages to increase the torque dynamically more than average torque value.

== Reduction method ==
Step-skewing and continuous skewing are the effective measures to reduce the torque ripple, and so the cogging torque.

Mathematically, it is possible to relate torque ripple to a part of vibration of rotating electrical machines, as the radial and tangential Maxwell stress tensors contains the same parts of spatial and time harmonics.
