= Wheel speed sensor =

Type of tachometer

A wheel speed sensor (WSS) or vehicle speed sensor (VSS) is a type of tachometer. It is a sender device used for reading the speed of a vehicle's wheel rotation. It usually consists of a toothed ring and pickup.

== Automotive wheel speed sensor ==
=== Purpose ===
The wheel speed sensor was initially used to replace the mechanical linkage from the wheels to the speedometer, eliminating cable breakage and simplifying the gauge construction by eliminating moving parts. These sensors also produce data that allows automated driving aids like ABS to function.

=== Construction ===
The most common wheel speed sensor system consists of a ferromagnetic toothed reluctor ring and a sensor (which can be passive or active).

The tone wheel is typically made of steel and may be an open-air design, or sealed (as in the case of unitized bearing assemblies). The number of teeth is chosen as a trade-off between low-speed sensing/accuracy and high-speed sensing/cost. Greater numbers of teeth will require more machining operations and (in the case of passive sensors) produce a higher frequency output signal which may not be as easily interpreted at the receiving end, but give a better resolution and higher signal update rate. In more advanced systems, the teeth can be asymmetrically shaped to allow the sensor to distinguish between forward and reverse rotation of the wheel.

A passive sensor typically consists of a ferromagnetic rod which is oriented to project radially from the tone wheel with a permanent magnet at the opposite end. The rod is wound with fine wire which experiences an induced alternating voltage as the tone wheel rotates, as the teeth interfere with the magnetic field. Passive sensors output a sinusoidal signal which grows in magnitude and frequency with wheel speed.

A variation of the passive sensor does not have a magnet backing it, but rather a tone wheel which consists of alternating magnetic poles produce the alternating voltage. The output of this sensor tends to resemble a square wave, rather than a sinusoid, but still increases in magnitude as wheels speed increases.

An active sensor is a passive sensor with signal conditioning circuitry built into the device. This signal conditioning may be amplifying the signal's magnitude; changing the signal's form to PWM, square wave, or others; or encoding the value into a communication protocol before transmission.

=== Variations ===
The vehicle speed sensor (VSS) may be, but is not always, a true wheel speed sensor. For example, in the Ford AOD transmission, the VSS is mounted to the tailshaft extension housing and is a self-contained tone ring and sensor. Though this does not give wheel speed (as each wheel in an axle with a differential is able to turn at differing speeds, and neither is solely dependent on the driveshaft for its final speed), under typical driving conditions this is close enough to provide the speedometer signal, and was used for the rear wheel ABS systems on 1987 and newer Ford F-Series, the first pickups with ABS.

== Special purpose speed sensors ==
=== Road vehicles ===
Wheel speed sensors are a critical component of anti-lock braking systems.

=== Rotary speed sensors for rail vehicles ===
Many of the subsystems in a rail vehicle, such as a locomotive or multiple unit, depend on a reliable and precise rotary speed signal, in some cases as a measure of the speed or changes in the speed. This applies in particular to traction control, but also to wheel slide protection, registration, train control, door control and so on. These tasks are performed by a number of rotary speed sensors that may be found in various parts of the vehicle.

Speed sensor failures are frequent, and are mainly due to the extremely harsh operating conditions encountered in rail vehicles. The relevant standards specify detailed test criteria, but in practical operation the conditions encountered are often even more extreme (such as shock/vibration and especially electromagnetic compatibility (EMC)).

=== Rotary speed sensors for motors ===
Although rail vehicles occasionally do use drives without sensors, most need a rotary speed sensor for their regulator system. The most common type is a two-channel sensor that scans a toothed wheel on the motor shaft or gearbox which may be dedicated to this purpose or may be already present in the drive system.

Modern Hall-effect sensors of this type make use of the principle of magnetic field modulation and are suitable for ferromagnetic target wheels with a module between m = 1 and m = 3.5 (D.P.=25 to D.P.=7). The form of the teeth is of secondary importance; target wheels with involute or rectangular toothing can be scanned. Depending on the diameter and teeth of the wheel it is possible to get between 60 and 300 pulses per revolution, which is sufficient for drives of lower and medium traction performance.

This type of sensor normally consists of two Hall-effect sensors, a rare-earth magnet and appropriate evaluation electronics. The field of the magnet is modulated by the passing target teeth. This modulation is registered by the Hall sensors, converted by a comparator stage to a square wave signal and amplified in a driver stage.

The Hall effect varies greatly with temperature. The sensors’ sensitivity and also the signal offset therefore depend not only on the air gap but also on the temperature. This also very much reduces the maximum permissible air gap between the sensor and the target wheel. At room temperature an air gap of 2 to 3 mm can be tolerated without difficulty for a typical target wheel of module m = 2, but in the required temperature range of from −40 °C to 120 °C the maximum gap for effective signal registration drops to 1.3 mm. Smaller pitch target wheels with module m = 1 are often used to get a higher time resolution or to make the construction more compact. In this case the maximum possible air gap is only 0.5 to 0.8 mm.

For the design engineer, the visible air gap that the sensor ends up with is primarily the result of the specific machine design, but is subject to whatever constraints are needed to register the rotary speed. If this means that the possible air gap has to lie within a very small range, then this will also restrict the mechanical tolerances of the motor housing and target wheels to prevent signal dropouts during operation. This means that in practice there may be problems, particularly with smaller pitched target wheels of module m = 1 and disadvantageous combinations of tolerances and extreme temperatures. From the point of view of the motor manufacturer, and even more so the operator, it is therefore better to look for speed sensors with a wider range of air gap.

The primary signal from a Hall sensor loses amplitude sharply as the air gap increases. For Hall sensor manufacturers this means that they need to provide maximum possible compensation for the Hall signal's physically induced offset drift. The conventional way of doing this is to measure the temperature at the sensor and use this information to compensate the offset, but this fails for two reasons: firstly because the drift does not vary linearly with the temperature, and secondly because not even the sign of the drift is the same for all sensors.

Some sensors now offer an integrated signal processor that attempts to correct the offset and amplitude of the Hall sensor signals. This correction enables a larger maximum permissible air gap at the speed sensor. On a module m = 1 target wheel these new sensors can tolerate an air gap of 1.4 mm, which is wider than that for conventional speed sensors on module m = 2 target wheels. On a module m = 2 target wheel the new speed sensors can tolerate gap of as much as 2.2 mm. It has also been possible to markedly increase the signal quality. Both the duty cycle and the phase displacement between the two channels is at least three times as stable in the face of fluctuating air gap and temperature drift. In addition, in spite of the complex electronics it has also been possible to increase the mean time between failures for the new speed sensors by a factor of three to four. So they not only provide more precise signals, their signal availability is also significantly better.

An alternative to Hall-effect sensors with gears are sensors or encoders which use [magnetoresistance]. Because the target wheel is an active, multipole magnet, air gaps can be even larger, up to 4.0 mm. Because magnetoresistive sensors are angle-sensitive and amplitude-insensitive, signal quality is increased over Hall sensors in fluctuating gap applications. Also the signal quality is much higher, enabling [interpolation] within the sensor/encoder or by an external circuit.

==== Motor encoders with integrated bearings ====
There is a limit on the number of pulses achievable by Hall sensors without integrated bearings: with a 300 mm diameter target wheel it is normally not possible to get beyond 300 pulses per revolution. But many locomotives and electric multiple units (EMUs) need higher numbers of pulses for proper operation of the traction converter, for instance when there are tight constraints on the traction regulator at low speeds.

Such Hall-effect sensor applications may benefit from built-in bearings, which can tolerate an air gap many orders of magnitude smaller because of the greatly reduced play on the actual sensor as opposed to that of the motor bearing. This makes it possible to choose a much smaller pitch for the measuring scale, right down to module m = 0.22. Likewise, the magnetoresistive sensors offer even higher resolution and accuracy than Hall sensors when implemented in motor encoders with integrated bearings.

For even greater signal accuracy a precision encoder can be used.

The functional principles of the two encoders are similar: a multichannel magneto-resistive sensor scans a target wheel with 256 teeth, generating sine and cosine signals. Arctangent interpolation is used to generate rectangular pulses from the sine/cosine signal periods. The precision encoder also possesses amplitude and offset correction functions. This makes it possible to further improve the signal quality, which greatly improves traction regulation.

=== Speed sensors on the wheelset ===
==== Bearingless wheelset speed sensors ====
Bearingless speed sensors may be found in almost every wheelset of a rail vehicle. They are principally used for wheel slide protection and usually supplied by the manufacturer of the wheel slide protection system. These sensors require a sufficiently small air gap and need to be particularly reliable. One special feature of rotary speed sensors that are used for wheel slide protection is their integrated monitoring functions. Two-wire sensors with a current output of 7 mA/14 mA are used to detect broken cables. Other designs provide for an output voltage of around 7 V as soon as the signal frequency drops below 1 Hz. Another method used is to detect a 50 MHz output signal from the sensor when the power supply is periodically modulated at 50 MHz. It is also common for two-channel sensors to have electrically isolated channels.

Occasionally it is necessary to take off the wheel slide protection signal at the traction motor, and the output frequency is then often too high for the wheel slide protection electronics. For this application a speed sensor with an integrated frequency divider or encoder can be utilized.

==== Wheelset pulse generator with integrated bearing ====
A rail vehicle, particularly a locomotive, possesses numerous subsystems that require separate, electrically isolated speed signals. There usually are neither enough mounting places nor is there sufficient space where separate pulse generators could be installed. Multi-channel pulse generators that are flange-mounted onto the bearing shells or covers of wheelsets offer a solution. Using a number of bearingless speed sensors would also involve additional cables, which should preferably be avoided for outdoor equipment because they are so susceptible to damage, for instance from flying track ballast.

==== Optical sensor ====
From one to four channels can be implemented, each channel having a photosensor that scans one of at most two signal tracks on a slotted disk. Experience shows that the possible number of channels achievable by this technique is still not enough. A number of subsystems therefore have to make do with looped-through signals from the wheel slide protection electronics and are therefore forced to accept, for instance, the available number of pulses, although a separate speed signal might well have some advantages.

The use of optical sensors is widespread in industry. They have two fundamental problems in functioning reliably for years, the optical components are extremely susceptible to dirt, and the light source ages too quickly.

Traces of dirt greatly reduce the amount of light that passes through the lens and can cause signal dropout. These encoders are therefore required to be very well sealed. Further problems are encountered when the pulse generators are used in environments in which the dew point is passed: the lenses fog and the signal is frequently interrupted.

The light sources used are light-emitting diodes (LEDs). But LEDs are always subject to aging, which over a few years leads to a noticeably reduced beam. Attempts are made to compensate for this by using special regulators that gradually increase the current through the LED, but unfortunately this further accelerates the aging process.

==== Magnetic sensor ====
The principle used in scanning a ferromagnetic measuring scale magnetically does not exhibit these deficiencies. During many years’ experience of using magnetic encoders there have been occasions when a seal has failed and a pulse generator has been found to be completely covered in a thick layer of brake dust and other dirt, but such pulse generators still functioned perfectly.

Historically, magnetic sensor systems cost more than optical systems, but this difference is narrowing rapidly. Magnetic Hall and magnetoresistive sensor systems can be imbedded in plastic or potting material, which increases mechanical reliability and eliminates damage from water and grease.

Wheel speed sensors can also include hysteresis. This suppresses any extraneous pulses while the vehicle is at a standstill.

Pulse generators constructed in accordance with this principle have been successfully field tested by several rail operators since the beginning of 2005. The type test specified in EN 50155 has also been successfully completed, so that these pulse generators can now be delivered.

==== Wheelset pulse generators with integrated bearings for inside-journal bogies ====
Inside-journal bogies make particular demands on the pulse generator designer because they have no bearing cover on the end to serve as the basis from which the rotation of the wheelset shaft could be registered. In this case the pulse generator has to be mounted on a shaft stub attached to the wheelset and fitted with a torque converter connected to the bogie frame to prevent it from rotating.

The extreme vibration in this location leads to a considerable load on the pulse generator bearing, which, with this method of installation has to carry not only the relatively small mass of the pulse generator shaft but that of the entire pulse generator. When we consider that bearing life reduces with at least the third power of the load we can see that a reliable and durable pulse generator for such a situation cannot merely be adapted from the more common standard pulse generator for outside-journal bogies merely by fitting and intermediate flange or similar construction. It really is necessary to have a pulse generator with a modified design adapted to the requirements of such a location.

=== Speed sensors for non-magnetic target wheels or applications that produce swarf ===
Some transport companies are faced with a special problem: the circulating air that keeps the motors cool carries swarf abraded from the wheels and rails. This collects on the heads of magnetic sensors. There are also increasingly motors in which sensors have to scan aluminium target wheels, for instance because the impellers are made of an aluminium alloy and the manufacturer does not wish to have to shrink on a separate ferromagnetic gear rim.

For these applications there are speed sensors available that do not require a target magnet. A number of transmitting and receiving coils are used to generate an alternating electric field with a frequency of the order of 1 MHz and the modulation of the coupling between senders and receivers is then evaluated. This sensor is installation and signal compatible to the magnetic sensors; for most common target wheel modules the units can simply be replaced without any other measures being necessary.

=== Speed sensors with interpolation ===
Customers often want a higher number of pulses per revolution than can be achieved in the space available and with the smallest module m = 1. To achieve this goal, sensors are available which offer interpolation. These offer output of 2-64X the original number of gear teeth or magnetic poles on the target wheel. Accuracy is dependent on the quality of sensor input: Hall sensors are lower cost, but lower accuracy, magnetoresistive sensors are higher cost, but higher accuracy.
