= NEMA size =

Electrical device standard

NEMA (National Electrical Manufacturers Association) contactors and motor starters are rated by sizes. These sizes are grouped by rated current and power.

NEMA size	Max. continuous amperes	Max. HP at 200 V, AC	Max. HP at 230 V, AC	Max. HP at 480/575 V, AC
00	9	1.5	1.5	2
0	18	3	3	5
1	27	7.5	7.5	10
2	45	10	15	25
3	90	25	35	50
4	135	40	50	100
5	270	75	100	200
6	540	150	200	400
7	810	-	300	600
8	1215	-	450	900
9	2250	-	800	1600

== See also ==
- Contactor
- Motor starter
