= Korndörfer autotransformer starter =

Korndorfer starter with motor (M), autotransformer (AT) and three switches (1, 2, 3)

In electrical engineering, the Korndorfer starter is a technique used for reduced voltage soft starting of induction motors. The circuit uses a three-phase autotransformer and three three-phase switches. This motor starting method has been updated and improved by Hilton Raymond Bacon.

== Operation ==
The Korndorfer starter can be used manually. Newer devices provide fully automatic operation, which in addition would have: triple-pole line contactor (switch), start contactor, running contactor, three single-pole overload relays, autotransformer with a set tap-changing links, a suitable timer, and start and stop pushbuttons.

If all switches are open the motor is completely disconnected from the three-phase network.

To start the motor, first the switches 1 and 2 are closed. This supplies the motor a lower voltage from the autotransformer. The lower voltage limits the input current to the initially stationary motor, which accelerates. The torque of the motor is also lowered.

The motor continues to increase its speed until the motor torque and the load torque balance each other and a steady speed is achieved. At this stage switch 2 is opened and momentarily the motor is supplied by even lower voltage, because the windings of the autotransformer act as inductors connected in series with motor. This time is short - just enough to disconnect the switch 1 and engage switch 3, which connects the full voltage to the motor. Further increase in speed begins and motor reaches its full rated speed.

At this point the "soft start" is ended and motor can work under full load. The autotransformer is no longer required and is de-energized by opening switch 1 . The motor is supplied directly from the three-phase network. To stop the motor, switch 3 is opened.

== Advantages ==
The Korndorfer starter limits significantly the inrush current. It is used for large motors, in which start by direct connection to the network is not possible. For large motors also the star-delta starter cannot be used, especially if they are started with a significant load.

The circuit has advantage over starting with a regular autotransformer, which needs to be at some point completely disconnected during the start inducing high voltage impulses, which can damage the electrical insulation of the stator.

The most effective ratio of the autotransformer is between 65-80%.

== Drawbacks ==
The circuit is quite complex and involves relatively expensive autotransformer. Due to the physical size of the whole device it might not be possible to add the Korndorfer starter to an existing machine if space is scarce.

== History ==
The reduced voltage autotransformer starter or Korndorfer starter was invented in 1908, by Max Korndörfer of Berlin. He filed the application with the U.S. Patent office in May 1908 and was granted the patent US 1,096,922 in May 1914. Max Korndörfer assigned his patent to the General Electric Company.

An induction motor draws very high starting current during its acceleration to full rated speed, typically 6 to 10 times the full load current. Reduced starting current is desirable where the electrical grid is not of sufficient capacity, or where the driven load cannot withstand high starting torque. One basic method to reduce the starting current is with a reduced voltage autotransformer with taps at 50%, 65% and 80% of the applied line voltage; once the motor is started the autotransformer is switched out of circuit.

=== Description of the Korndörfer patent 1,096,922 ===
Max Korndörfer claimed four methods of using an autotransformer for reduced voltage motor starting. Three of the methods are not used by the industry and it is the 4th method of starting that has been in use for more than a hundred years

The fourth method is with the star switch closed and as the motor accelerates a change over is made from the reduced voltage tap on the autotransformer to direct-on-line.

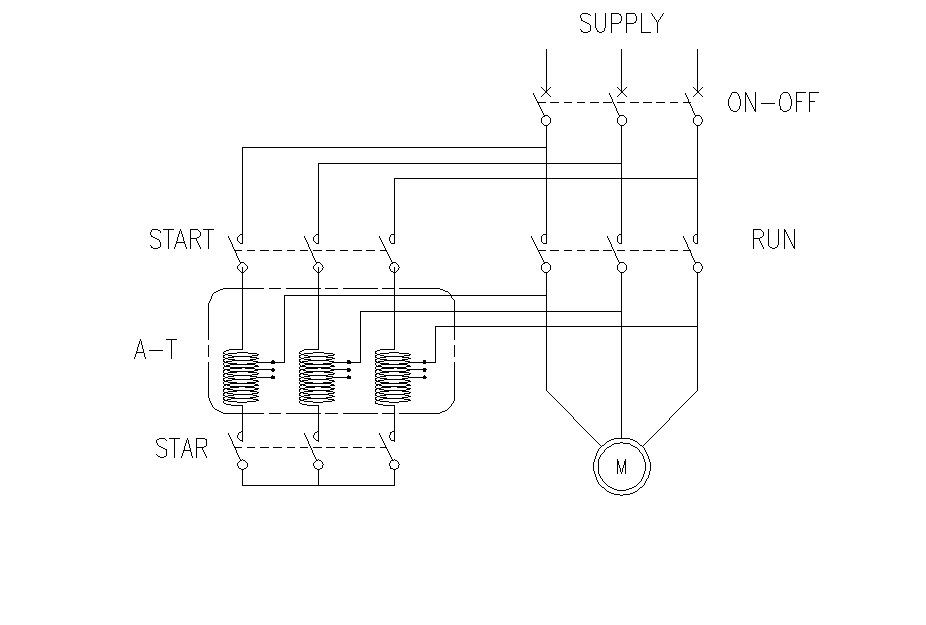

The starting sequence is :-

- The Star switch is closed
- The Start switch is closed to energise the autotransformer
- The motor is connected at a selected reduced voltage tap on the autotransformer and starts to turn and accelerate
- After a predetermined period the Star switch will open
- After a milli-second delay the Run switch will close, connecting full line voltage to the motor
- The Start switch will then open and the motor will be at operational speed

Since 1920, the autotransformer starter has been the most popular device for reducing the starting current inrush for induction motors; it provides maximum starting torque with minimum line current.

Table 1 - Starting Torque /Current with 3 Reduced Voltage taps

Voltage	50%tap	65%tap	80%tap
Torque	25%	42%	64%
Current	50%	65%	80%

Manufactures offer their reduced voltage autotransformer in two configurations, with a 2 coil construction or with a 3 coil construction, figures 2 and 3.

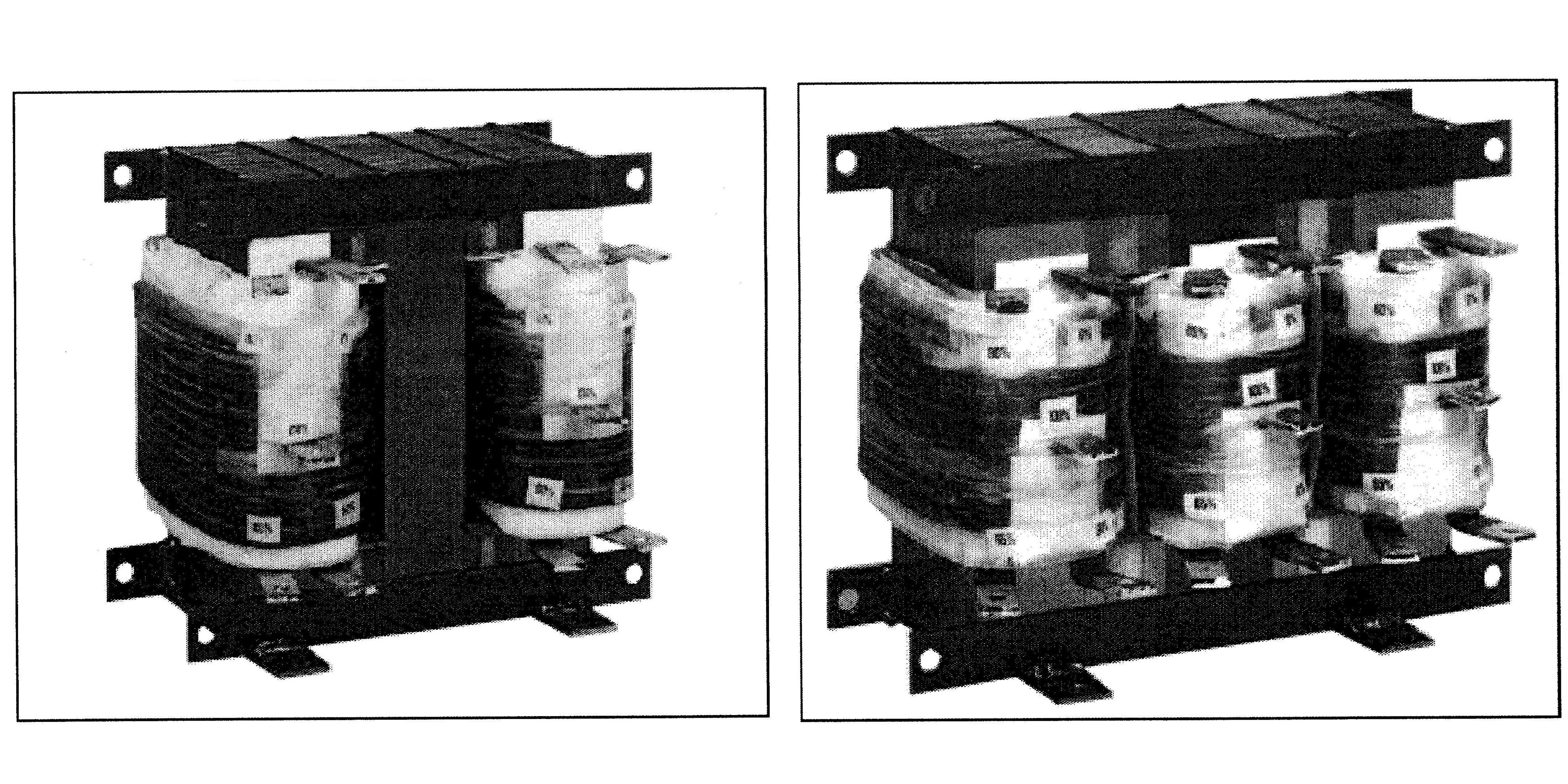

Each apparatus has reduced voltage taps at 50%, 65% and 80% based upon National Electrical Manufacturers Association recommendations.

The phase coils are traditional wound in a single coil assembly with the 0 to 50% winding section buried below the 50% to 100% windings in a single thermal mass as shown in figures 2 and 3

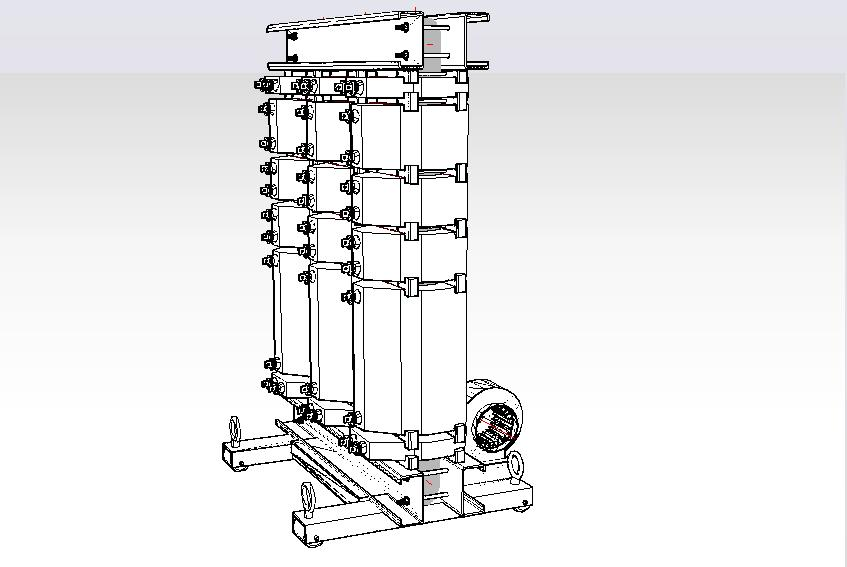
Figure 4. 3 Coil Assembly

Figure 4 shows an improved 1000 kW 11,000 Volt motor starter autotransformer with

- Axial cooling fans,
- Cast resin encapsulated coils,
- A plurality of windings providing a means of connection as a central switching apparatus,
- 9 starting voltage tap connections allowing for ± 5% variation of starting torque around NEMA recommended taps at 50%, 65% and 80%. This allows the selection of motor starting torque to be closely matched with the driven load requirements. Selection is by means of the connection links between the winding sections.

Table 2 - Starting Torque /Current with 9 Reduced Voltage Connections

Voltage	45%	50%	55%	60%	65%	70%	75%	80%	85%
Torque	20%	25%	30%	36%	42%	49%	56%	64%	72%
Current	45%	50%	55%	60%	65%	70%	75%	80%	85%

The thermal dissipation of the first starting stage is maximised by being a physically separated winding from the windings of the second starting step to full line voltage.

== Uses and styles ==
The Autotransformer motor starting apparatus is relatively simple compared to solid-state variable frequency drives. Since it does not contain any power electronics devices, the output waveform is a sine wave with no additional harmonic distortion or switching waveforms. No special shielding or cable length limitations are created. Cooling requirements are similar to those of a transformer or switchgear. The reduced-voltage starter provides the maximum torque with a minimum of line current.

== Medium voltage starters ==
The low voltage (<600 V) Korndörfer motor starter is a proven workhorse over the years. However large medium/ high voltage motor starters have reported random autotransformer failures. The IEEE article by Dr.S.E.A. Emam & Pro.Dr.A.H. Amer of the Engineering Consulting Centre at Ain Shams University reports on some investigations made for a petroleum company on a 5,400 kW motor, without a clear reason for the failure. In their article they reported that Siemens was called in as a consultant and their solution was to fit R-C suppression /surge arresters similar to that used in other motor starter failures at a Venezuela pumping station. An article in the Wärtsilä technical journal 01.2009, reports that the four 2,900 kW thrusters motor autotransformers starters on Q4000 a multipurpose oil drill vessel suffered repeated autotransformer failures prior to 2008. Transformer manufacturers, switchgear manufacture and a European design organization could not give a clear reason for the failures. All auto-transformer six 3000 kW starters were replaced by variable speed electronic drives in 2008.

The “open transition” control scheme disconnects the motor from the power source causing the motor to slow down and get out of sync with the power phase, once reconnected, mechanical and electrical transients may damage the motor or its drive train.

Even with “closed transition” there is a transient produced at contact separation of the Star point switch. The transient is of a very short duration, less than 5 microseconds and occurs when the motor current from the secondary of the autotransformer is forced to the line voltage. This is a very fast event and is the origin of the destructive voltage transients that have caused major breakdowns of large medium and high voltage starters >1000 kW.

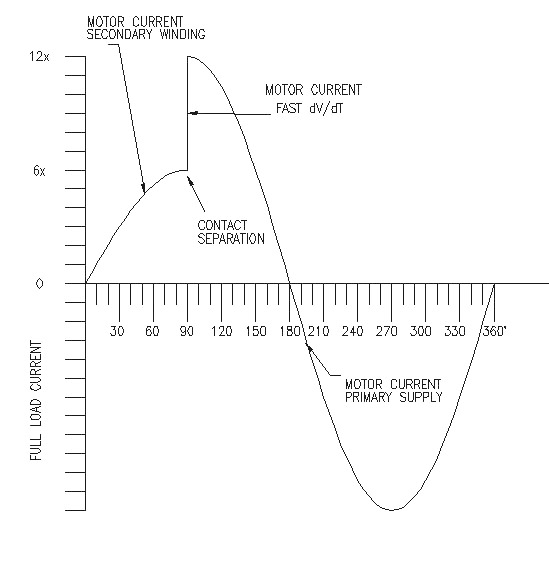
Figure 5

Michael Faraday D.C.L, F.R.S, in 1831 published a paper on his discovery of electromagnetic induction which is the time rate of change of the magnetic flux with a coil induces a voltage in that coil, the amplitude of the induced voltage is proportional to the velocity of flux linkages with the coil. With normal operation a step-up autotransformer would have flux linkages at the supply frequency; in the case of a very fast dv/dt at the instant of contact separation, the voltage induced into the redundant windings of the first starting stage, will be extremely large. This basic principle explains the source of the destructive transient voltage in the Korndörfer motor starter apparatus.

A further transient problem is that with a single coil construction and a star switch, the autotransformer acts as a step-up transformer during the <5 microsecond period at contact separation of the Star point switch. With the motor connected to the 80% voltage tap there will be an escalation of the transient by 5:1 ratio.

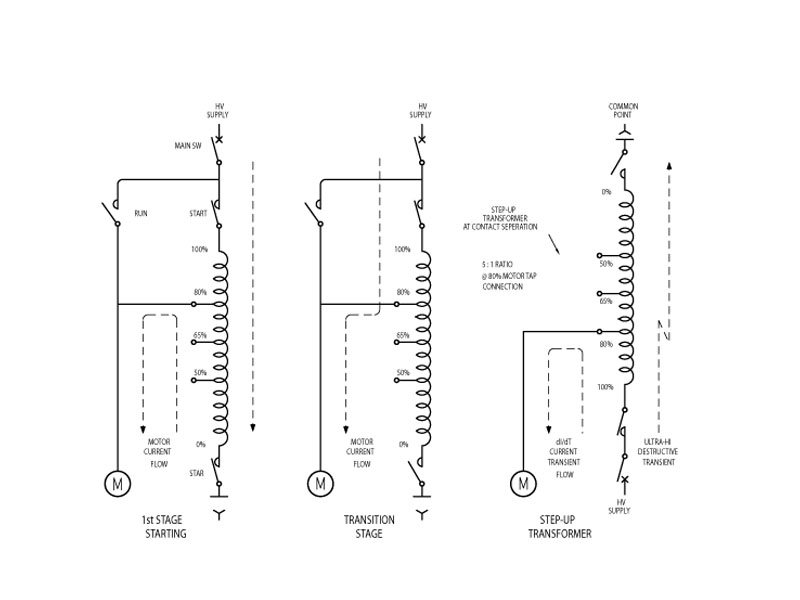

The low voltage Korndörfer autotransformer motor starter <600 volts is also subject to a similar voltage transient with a fast rise wave front, however with a lower operating voltage and state of the art insulation materials in use may be a factor that contributes to its longevity.

To reduce the risk of any voltage surge it is desirable to replace the Korndörfer motor starter circuit with an autotransformer that has a central switch circuit that disconnects redundant windings of the first starting stage from the circuit at the transition, thereby preventing any step-up transformer connection and voltage escalation.

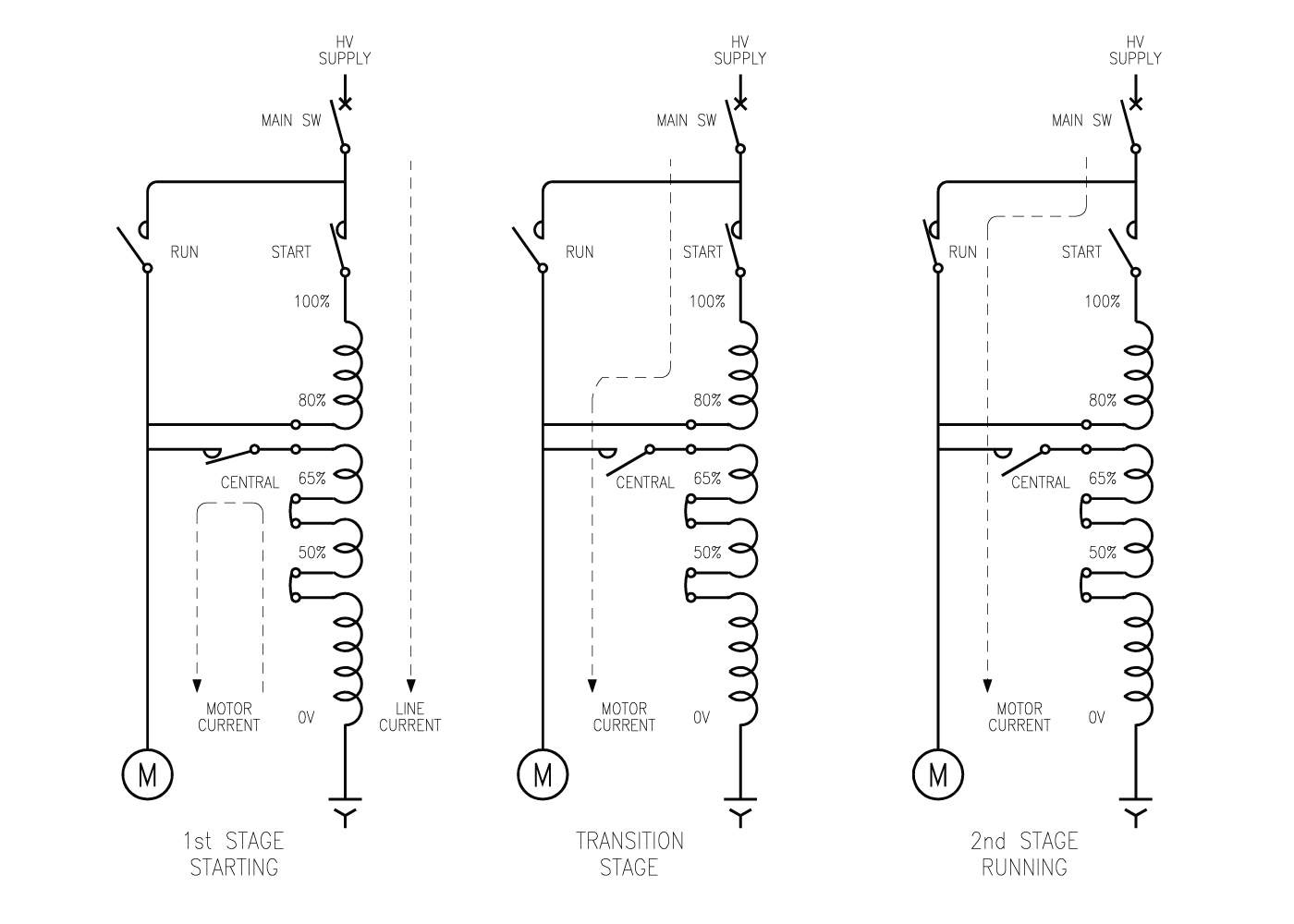

The root cause of destructive transients in Korndörfer starters, it is random switching of the changeover of motor current. The uncontrolled timing of the changeover allows the peak motor current to be switched at any point on the wave. Figure 5 shows the changeover at 90 degrees. This is a worst-case scenario, peak current at changeover, creates a very high and fast transient. The central switch circuit prevents voltage escalation, as discussed above. It is therefore desirable to control the point on the wave at which to switch, the ideal point is when the motor amperes to the lowest value in all the active windings of the autotransformer.

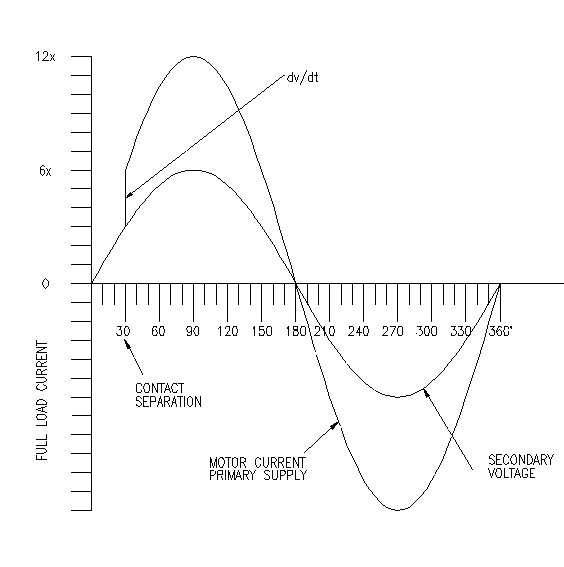

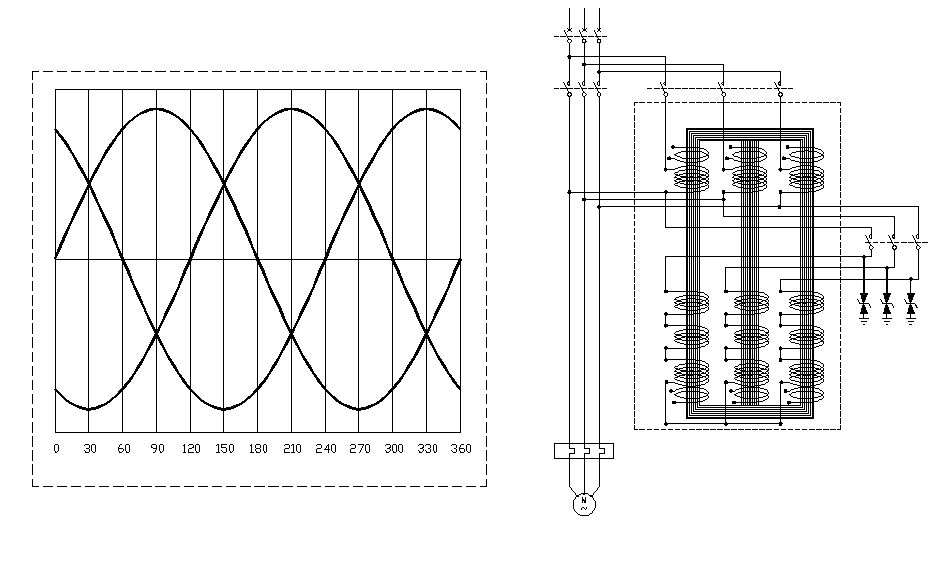
A 3-coil autotransformer requires a 3 pole switch to control 3 phase voltages, an examination of figure 9 shows three sine waves displaced at 120 degree intervals. There appears there is no real point on the cycle where all three phases can be switched simultaneously at any equal low motor amperage without resorting to complex staggered switching methods.

(Left)Figure 9.-3 phase power sine curves (Right)Figure 10. 3-coil Schematic

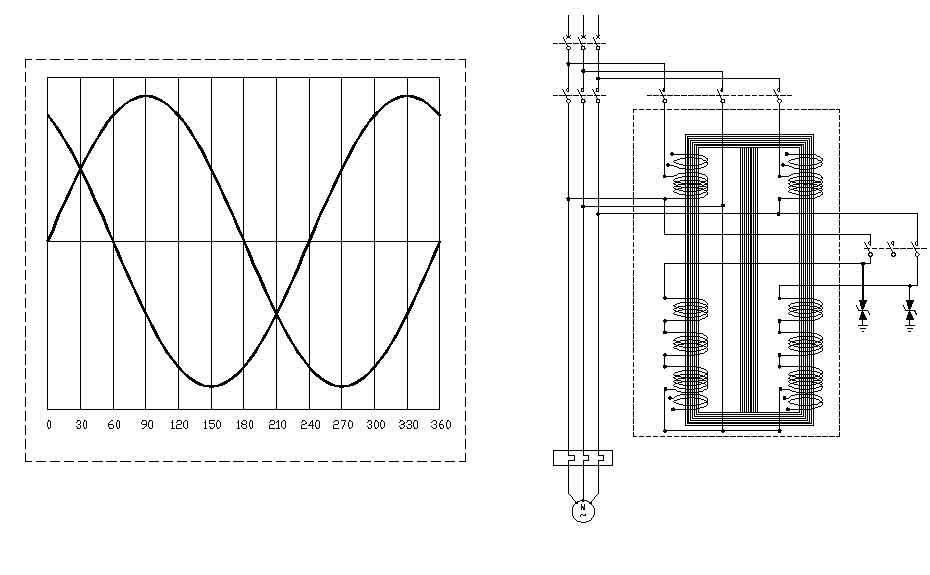

(Left)Figure11. 2-Coil 2 Phase Sine Curves (Right)Figure 12. 2-Coil Schematic

A 2-coil autotransformer has only two windings that are required to be switched at transition. Figure 11 shows the motor current curves for a 2-coil autotransformer. Line 2 is not switched. This topology is suitable for controlled switching.

An inspection of the sine curves shows that at 30 degrees and 210 degrees, both motor currents are at the same value and are in the same phase quadrant. Therefore the magnetic core flux in first leg of the transformer is the same as the magnetic core flux in the third leg, the centre leg has no windings and its magnetic flux is of no interest. At 30 degrees the amplitude of the motor currents supplied by the autotransformer are only half the peak motor current that occurs at 90 degrees.(sine30° = 0.5) see Figure 8.

The central switch therefore prevents any step-up autotransformer connection and a practicable means of controlling the switching transient to a lower value than the star connected switch.

The important points for controlled central switching are:

- The central switch is closed before the motor has power supplied,
- There is no break in motor current, only a transfer of current,
- A synchronized, controlled opening of the central switch.
- Synchronized by means of zero crossing of the motor current waveform.

The central switch may be an electromechanical switch or an electronic device using IGBT, EMT or other similar solid-state devices.

The electronic central switch has only to open its circuit forcing the motor current to transfer into the 80% winding in a no-break, closed transition action. It can provide frictionless, accurate and instant switching actions that are necessary to operate the changeover point at 30 degrees.

A method of detecting current zero crossing is required to provide the timing measurement for controlled switching. A current to voltage transformer is used for accurate triggering of such a timing signal for a controlled switch opening.

Electromechanical central switch has to be carefully selected as it has inherent operating times both opening and closing. It has to have a stored-energy mechanism and a DC operated release solenoid for a controllable “open” command signal. Detection of the motor current zero crossing may be obtained from a current transformer/resistor voltage sensing circuit, not a voltage crossing. The use of electromechanical contactors is not recommended for a central switch as their switch opening speed consistency is subjected to the voltage applied to the hold-in coil. During a motor start the line voltage drop will fluctuate and the magnetic flux in the hold-in device will also vary, causing deviations in opening times.

== Controlled switching for reducing motor current surge ==
The change in motor starting current from the reduced voltage stage can be minimised by switching at transition to a primary reactor second starting stage. In his patent Max Korndörfer shows an external reactor coil method "so as to make the gradation in voltage between steps" before a changeover to direct-on-line.

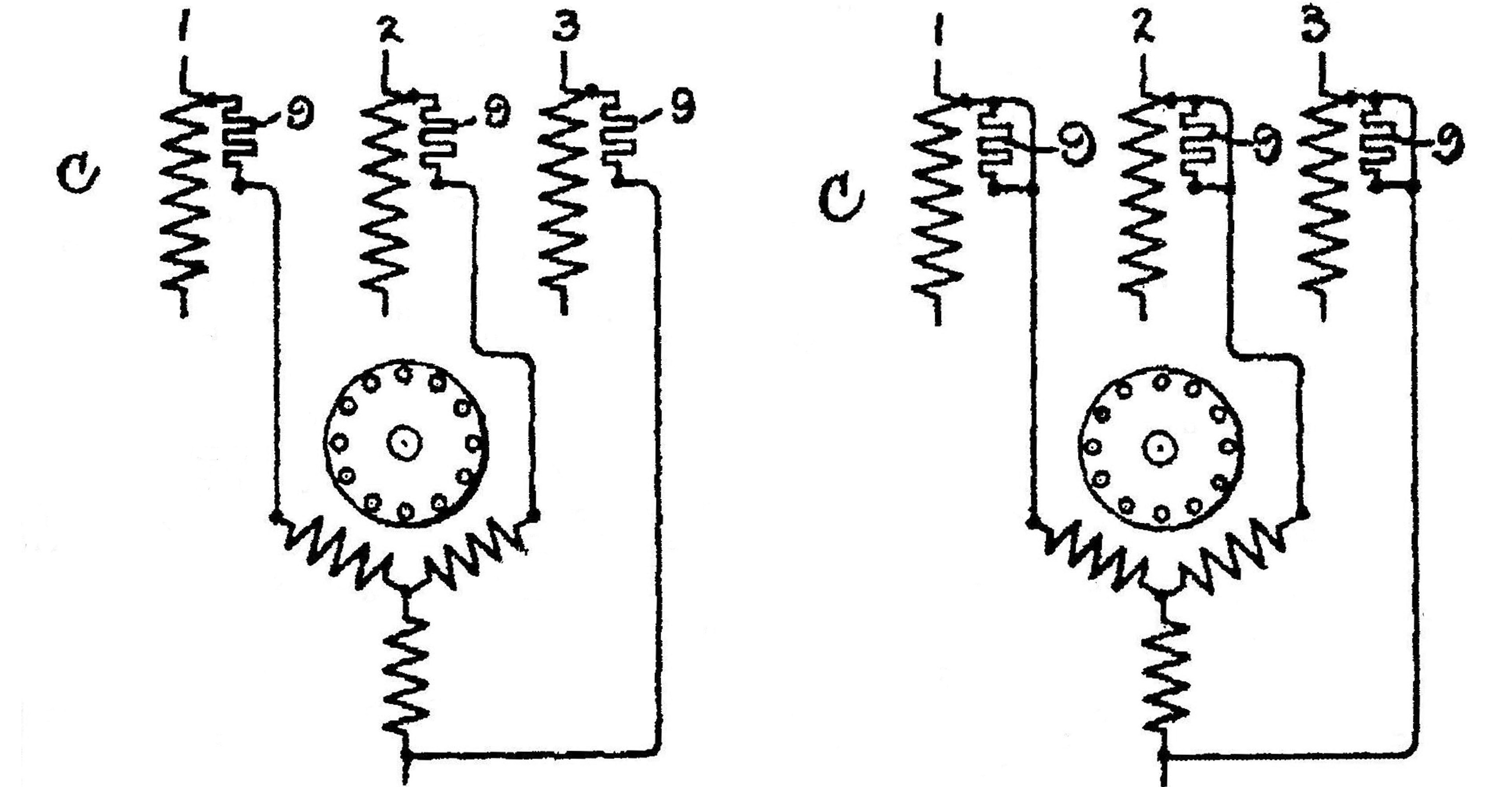

The external reactor coil method for a second starting stage has merit, as the voltage to the motor is a function of the motor current taken from the line. It can be seen that during a second stage with a series reactor, that during acceleration the motor voltage will rise as the line current drops. This relationship results in greater acceleration energy to a higher motor speed and less disturbance at changeover to full line voltage.

General Electric engineers attempted to improve Korndörfer Methods but no methods proposed were successful.
