= Motor starter =

Starter motor or motor starter may refer to:

- Motor controller, a device that regulates the performance of an electric motor
- Starter motor, an electric motor that rotates an internal combustion engine until it can power itself, such as in automobiles
