= A600 =

A600 may refer to:

- Amiga 600, home computer released in 1992
- A600, the contact rating of smaller NEMA contactors and relays
- RotorWay A600 Talon, an American Helicopter design
