= Shaded-pole motor =

Type of AC single-phase induction motor

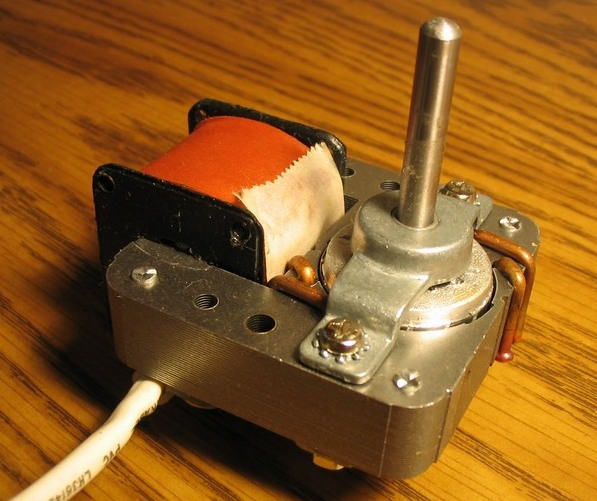
Small C-frame shaded-pole squirrel-cage motor. With the poles shown, the rotor will rotate in the clockwise direction.

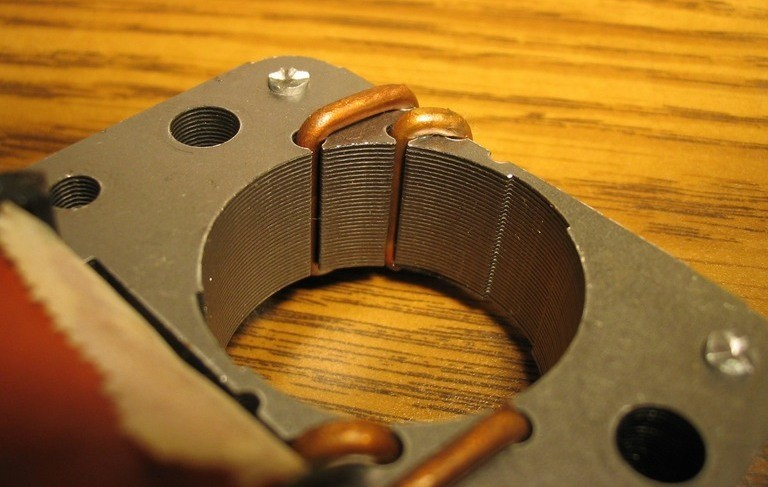
Shading coils (copper bars) within the magnetic circuit of the field coil

The shaded-pole motor is the original type of AC single-phase electric induction motor, dating back to at least as early as 1890.

A shaded-pole motor is a motor in which the auxiliary winding is composed of a copper ring or bar surrounding a portion of each pole to produce a weakly rotating magnetic field. When single-phase alternating current is supplied to the stator winding, shading provided to the poles elicits a phase shift in the motor’s magnetic field, causing it to rotate. This auxiliary single-turn winding is called a shading coil. Currents induced in this coil by the magnetic field create the second electrical phase by delaying the phase of magnetic flux change for that shaded pole enough to provide a two-phase rotating magnetic field whose motion the motor’s rotor follows, causing it to spin. The direction of rotation is from the unshaded to the shaded (ring) side of the pole.

Since the phase angle between the shaded and unshaded sections is small, shaded-pole motors produce only a small starting torque relative to torque at full speed. Shaded-pole motors of the asymmetrical type shown are reversible only by disassembly and flipping over of the stator, though some similar-looking motors have small, switch-shortable auxiliary windings of thin wire instead of thick copper bars and can reverse electrically. Another method of electrical reversing involves four coils (two pairs of identical coils).

The common, asymmetrical form of these motors (pictured) has only one winding, with no capacitor or starting windings/starting switch, making them economical and reliable. More powerful and more modern types may have multiple physical windings, though electrically only one, and a capacitor may be used. Because their starting torque is low, they are best suited to driving fans or other loads that are easily started. They may have multiple taps near one electrical end of the winding, which provides variable speed and power by selection of one tap at a time, as in ceiling fans. Moreover, they are compatible with TRIAC-based variable-speed controls, which often are used with fans.

Such motors are built in power sizes up to about 1/4 horsepower (190 W) output. Above about 1/3 horsepower (250 W) they are not common, and for more powerful motors other designs offer better characteristics. A main disadvantage is their low efficiency of around 26%. A major advantage is that the motor's stall current is only slightly higher than the running current, so there is low risk of severe over-heating or tripping the circuit protection if the motor is stalled for some reason.

Operation of a two-pole squirrel-cage shaded-pole motor showing its rotating magnetic field

== Types ==
- Squirrel-cage asynchronous: The most common type of shaded-pole motor in fractional horsepower use has a squirrel-cage rotor that consists of a laminated steel cylinder with conductive copper or aluminum bars embedded lengthwise in its surface, connected at the ends.
- Synchronous permamagnetized uses a magnetized rotor, e.g. a permanent magnet. This rotor rotates synchronously with the rotating magnetic field: if the rotor begins to lag behind the rotating field, driving torque increases and the rotor speeds up slightly until the rotor's position within the rotating field is a point where torque = drag; similarly, if the rotation of the field slows down, the rotor will advance relative to the field, torque will decline, or even become negative, slowing the speed of the rotor until it again reaches a position relative to the field where torque = drag.
  Because of this, these motors are often used to drive electric clocks and, occasionally, phonograph turntables. In these applications, the speed of the motor is as accurate as the frequency of the mains power applied to the motor. These motors are also used in electric shavers. Frequently, the rotor and its associated reduction geartrain are encased in an aluminium, copper, or plastic enclosure; the enclosed rotor is driven magnetically through the enclosure. Such geared motors are commonly available with the final output shaft or gear rotating from 600 RPM down to as low as 1/168 revolution per hour (1 revolution per week).
- Synchronous squirrel-cage combines the two, in that the magnetized rotor is provided with a squirrel cage, so that the motor starts like an induction motor, once the rotor is pulled into synchronism with its magnet, the squirrel cage has no current induced in it and so plays no further part in the operation.

== Starting issues and torque limitations ==
The power output of shaded pole motors is usually very low. Because there is often no explicit starting mechanism, the rotor of a motor operating from a constant frequency mains supply must be very light so that it is capable of reaching running speed within one cycle of the mains frequency. A further development dispenses with the shading rings altogether. The application of power gives the magnetised rotor enough of a 'flick' to move it fast enough to establish synchronism. A mechanical means prevents the rotor from starting in the wrong direction. This design will only work satisfactorily if the standstill load is near to zero and has very little inertia. This is similar to the motor used in quartz-timed mechanical clocks. In more recent times, the use of variable frequency controls permits synchronous motors to start slowly and deliver more torque.

== See also ==
- Shading coil
