= Magnetic starter =

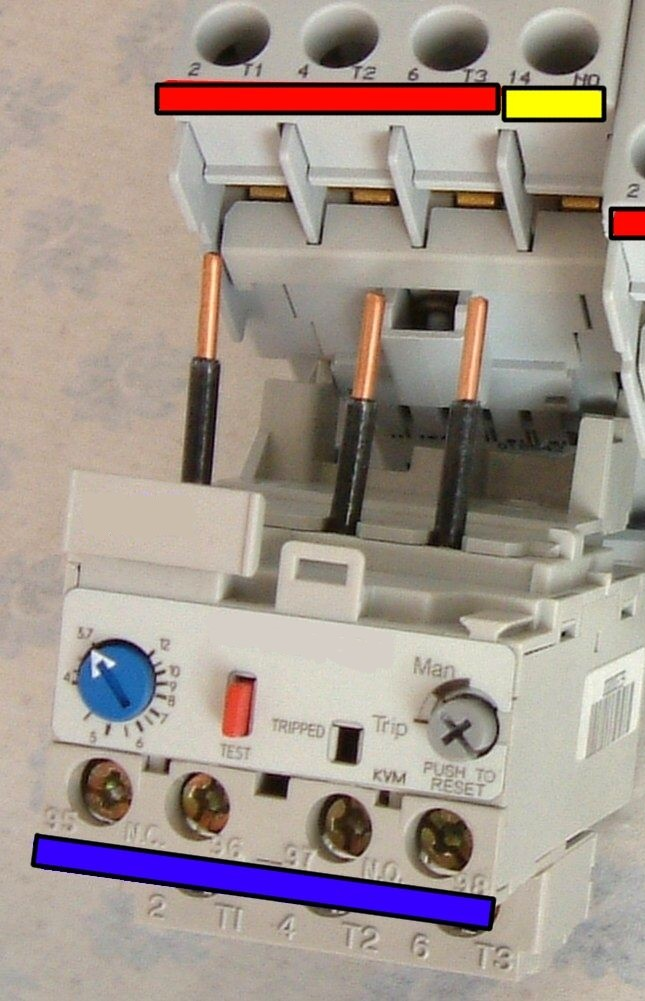
Contactor with overload relay

A magnetic starter is an electromagnetically operated switch which provides a safe method for starting an electric motor with a large load. Magnetic starters also provide under-voltage and overload protection and an automatic cutoff in the event of a power failure.

== Implementation ==
A magnetic starter has a contactor and an overload relay, which will open the control voltage to the starter coil if it detects an overload on a motor. The overload relay opens a set of contacts that are wired in series with the supply to the contactor feeding the motor. The characteristics of the heaters can be matched to the motor so that the motor is protected against overload. Recently, microprocessor-controlled motor digital protective relays offer more comprehensive protection of motors.

Due to the electromagnet in the contactor, if power to the machine should fail the contactor will automatically disengage. Unlike machines with an ordinary latching switch (such as a common light switch), when the power is resumed the machine will not operate until being turned on again. As a result, magnetic starters often use momentary switches for "off" and "on" functions, as this type of switch returns to a defined normal position when released. Latching switches do not have this feature and therefore are normally not used with a magnetic starter.

Motor control contactors can be fitted with short-circuit protection (fuses or circuit breakers), disconnecting means, overload relays and an enclosure to make a combination starter. Several combination starters and other switchgear and control devices can be grouped in a common enclosure called a motor control center.

== Operation ==
Typically starters are operated by two push switches, a "start" switch which is normally-off (i.e. push-to-make) and a "stop" switch which is normally-on (i.e. push-to-break).

When the motor is not running, although line voltage is available, no current is drawn by the starter or motor.

When the "start" button is pressed, the motor is not powered directly, rather the electromagnet in the contactor is energized. The magnetic switch in the contactor then engages, simultaneously switching current to the motor and providing self-sustaining current to maintain its own state. Thus when the start button is released, the magnetic switch remains engaged and the motor remains running.

Pressing the "stop" button breaks the circuit to the contactor which consequently de-energizes its electromagnet thus cutting current to the motor.

== Applications ==
Magnetic starters are commonly found on equipment drawing several horsepower or higher. Examples include woodworking machinery such as cabinet saws or shapers. Machines with smaller loads, such as a drill press or most handheld tools normally use only a switch instead. Magnetic starters are stock components for many machines, and aftermarket starters are also available for use as replacements or for retrofitting older machines.

Federal OSHA recognizes NFPA 79 2007 Edition standard 7.5.3 states "Upon restoration of the voltage or upon switching on the incoming supply, automatic or unintentional restarting of the machine shall be prevented when such a restart causes a hazardous condition.
