= Annette Clayton =

American business executive

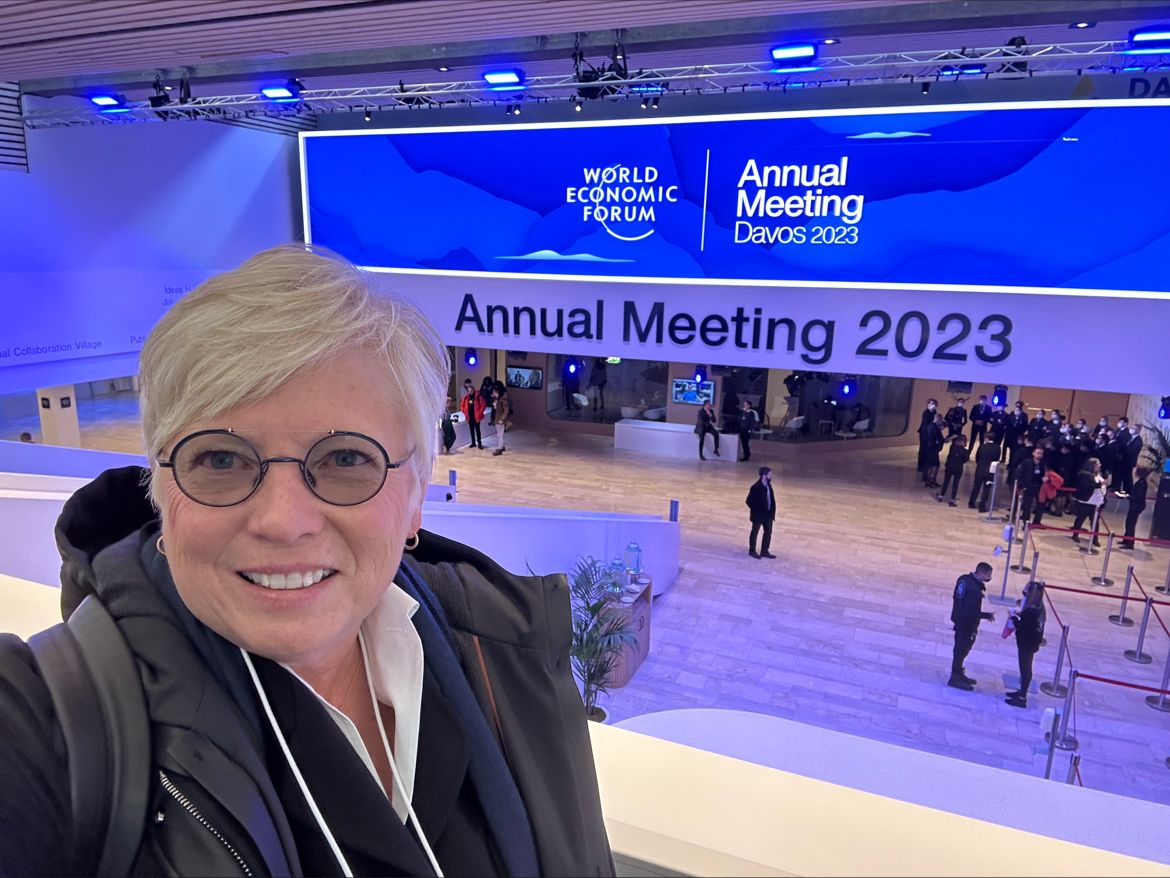
- Occupation: Business executive
- Board member of: Schneider Electric National Electrical Manufacturers Association; Duke Energy Corporation; NXP Semiconductors Nordson Corporation

Annette Clayton is an American business executive. She is the chairwoman and former CEO of Schneider Electric North America where she was also Chief Supply Chain Officer. She was also VP, Global Operations and Supply Chain at Dell. In July 2025, Clayton was appointed as the Chair of the Board of Directors for LayerZero Power Systems.

== Education ==
Annette graduated from the University of Dayton with a degree in Engineering Management and went on to Wright State University for a master's degree in engineering. She received an Accelerated Executive MBA from London Business School and a Board of Director course at Stanford University.

== Career ==
From 1983 to 2006, Annette worked at General Motors becoming the Vice President, Quality for North America and also the president of Saturn Corporation in 2001. She was on the board of Polaris Industries from 2003 till 2021. She was also the Vice President of Global Operations and Supply Chain at Dell from 2006 to 2021.

She is on the Board Of Directors of Duke Energy Corporation and NXP Semiconductors. Nordson Corporation elected Annette to its board of directors in February 2024.

In 2001, she joined Schneider Electric and became the CEO of Schneider Electric North America from 2016 to 2023. In 2021, she was appointed as the chairwoman of National Electrical Manufacturers Association.

Starting in July 2025, Clayton will be serving as the Chair of the Board of Directors for LayerZero Power Systems, following its acquisition by Advent International.

== Awards ==
- TIME 100 Climate, 2023
