= Mercury switch =

Type of electrical switch

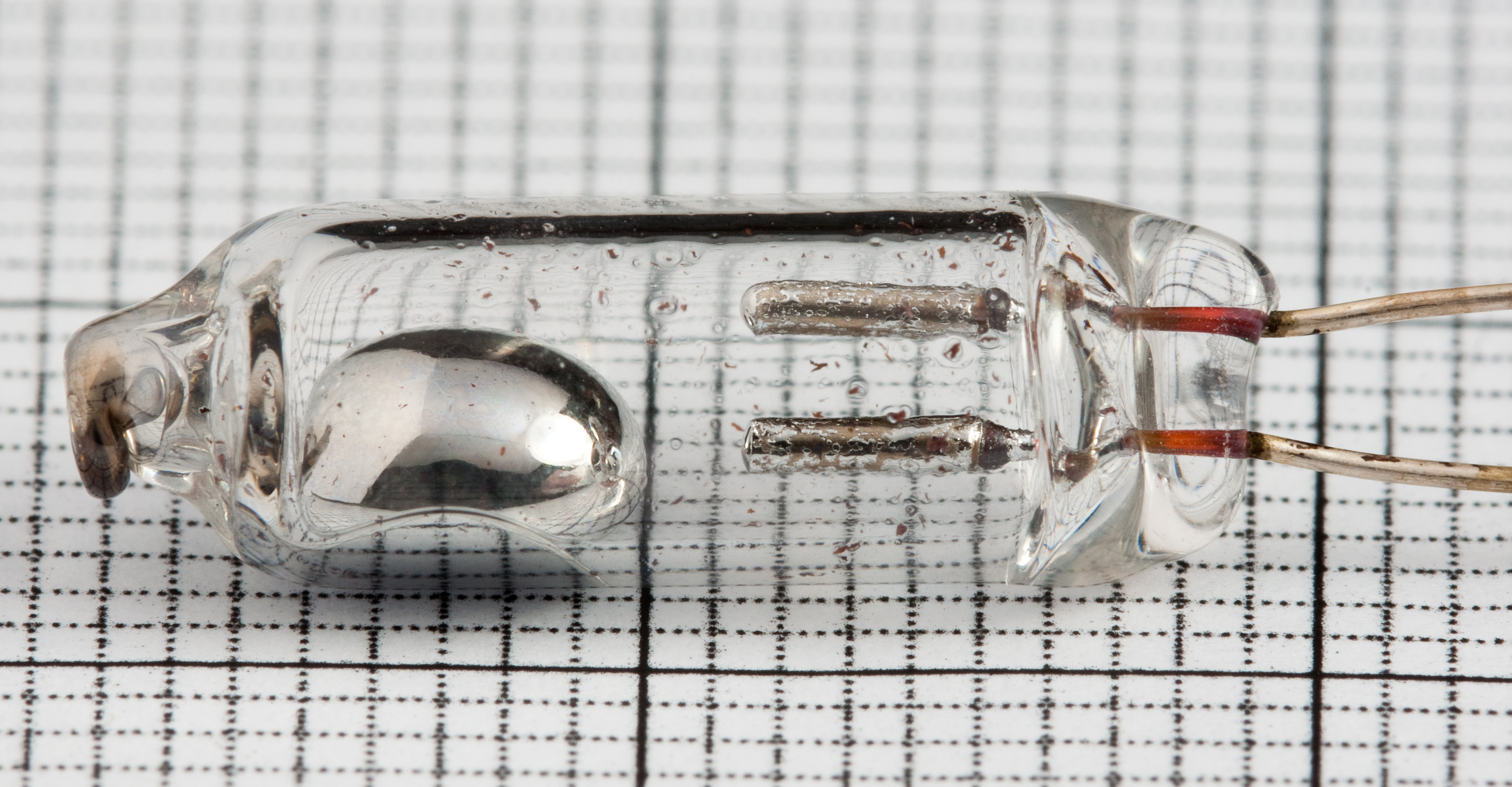
A Single-Pole, Single-Throw (SPST) mercury switch on millimetre graph paper, device length approximately 1.5 cm

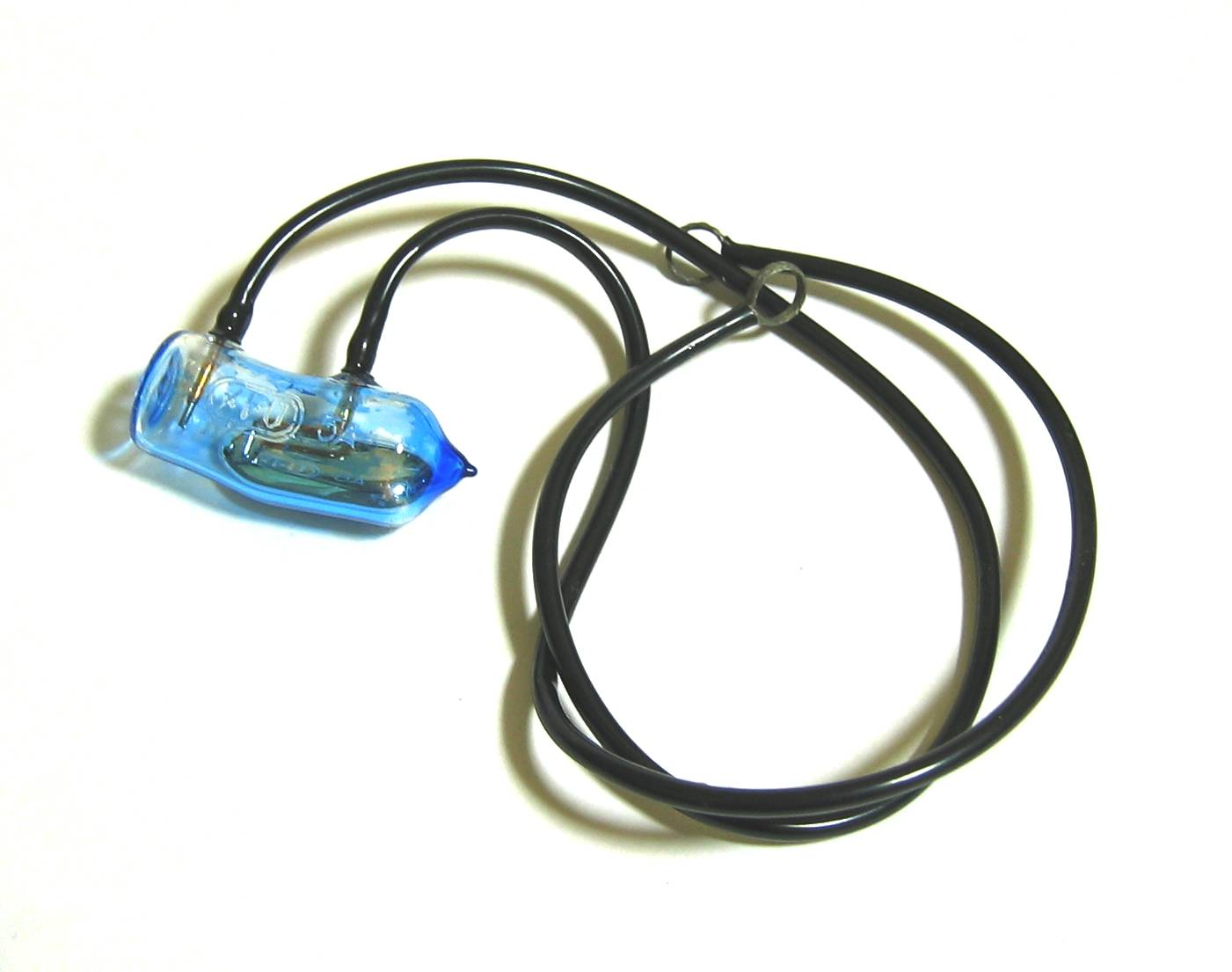
Another mercury switch design

A mercury switch is an electrical switch that opens and closes a circuit when a small amount of the liquid metal mercury connects metal electrodes to close the circuit. There are several different basic designs (tilt, displacement, radial, etc.) but they all share the common design strength of non-eroding switch contacts.

The most common is the mercury tilt switch. It is in one state (open or closed) when tilted one direction with respect to horizontal, and the other state when tilted the other direction. This is what older style thermostats used to turn a heater or air conditioner on or off.

The mercury displacement switch uses a 'plunger' that dips into a pool of mercury, raising the level in the container to contact at least one electrode. This design is used in relays in industrial applications that need to switch high current loads frequently. These relays use electromagnetic coils to pull steel sleeves inside hermetically sealed containers.

== History ==
From around 1905 to 1910 various mercury switches were invented, but the "mercury in glass envelope" switch got its start with patent 1598874 (filed on January 19, 1922 by Louis Phelan), which evolved into a more modern mercury switch with a straight tubular glass envelope via patent 2232626 (filed on October 7, 1937 by Harold Olson of Honeywell).

== Description ==
Mercury switches have one or more sets of electrical contacts in a sealed glass envelope that contains a small quantity of mercury. The envelope may also contain hydrogen at pressure, an inert gas, or a vacuum. Gravity constantly pulls the drop of mercury to the lowest point in the envelope. When the switch is tilted in the appropriate direction, the mercury touches a set of contacts, thus completing an electrical circuit. Tilting the switch in the opposite direction moves the mercury away from that set of contacts, breaking that circuit. The switch may contain multiple sets of contacts, closing different sets at different angles, allowing, for example, single-pole, double-throw (SPDT) operation.

== Advantages ==
Mercury switches offer several advantages over other switch types:

- The contacts are enclosed, so oxidation of the contact points is impossible.
- In hazardous locations, interrupting the circuit does not emit a spark that could ignite flammable gases.
- Contacts stay clean, and even if an internal arc occurs, the contact surfaces renew on every operation, so they don't wear out.
- Even a small drop of mercury has low resistance, so switches can carry useful amounts of current in a small size.
- Sensitivity of the drop to gravity provides a unique sensing function, and lends itself to simple, low-force mechanisms for manual or automatic operation.
- The switches are quiet, as no contacts abruptly snap together.
- The mass of the moving mercury drop provides an over center effect to avoid chattering as the switch tilts.
- The envelope can include contacts for two or more circuits.

== Disadvantages ==
Mercury switches have several disadvantages:

- There is a tendency for the intermittently exposed electrode to become damaged by the intense heat and destructive force of the electrical arc that forms whenever the circuit opens or closes, particularly if the circuit is being opened under a large inductive load. Certain refractory materials have been used to encase this electrode to mitigate this effect.
- Their relatively slow operating rate (due to the inertia of the mercury drop) makes them unsuitable for applications that require many operating cycles per second.
- Glass envelopes and wire electrodes may be fragile and require flexible leads to prevent damage to the envelope.
- The mercury drop forms a common electrode, so circuits are not isolated from each other in a multi-pole switch.
- Their sensitivity to gravity may make them unsuitable in portable or mobile devices that can change orientation or vibrate.
- Mercury compounds are highly toxic and accumulate in any food chain, so safety codes exclude mercury in many new designs.

== Uses ==
=== Roll sensing ===
Tilt switches provide a rollover or tip over warning for applications like construction equipment and lift vehicles that operate in rugged terrain. There are several non-mercury types, but few are implemented due to sensitivity to shock and vibration, causing false tripping. However, devices resistant to shock and vibration do exist.

=== Automotive uses ===
Automobile manufacturers once used mercury switches for lighting controls (for example, trunk lid lights), ride control, and anti-lock braking systems. Scrapped automobiles can leak mercury to the environment if these switches are not properly removed. Since 2003, new American-built cars no longer use mercury switches.

=== Fall alarms ===
Work performed in confined space (such as a welder inside a tank) raises special safety concerns. Tilt switches sound an alarm if a worker falls over.

=== Aircraft attitude indicators/artificial horizons ===
Electrically driven attitude indicators typically use mercury switches to keep the gyro axis vertical. When the gyro is off vertical, mercury switches trigger torque motors that move the gyro position back to the correct position. (Air driven attitude indicators use a different operating principle.)

=== Thermostats ===
Mercury switches were once common in bimetal thermostats. The weight of the movable mercury drop provided some hysteresis by a degree of over-center action. The bimetal spring had to move further to overcome the weight of the mercury, tending to hold it in the open or closed position. The mercury also provided positive on-off switching, and could withstand millions of cycles without contact degradation.

=== Doorbells ===
Some old doorbells, for example, the Soviet ZM-1U4, use mercury switches as current interrupters.

=== Pressure switches ===
Some pressure switches use a Bourdon tube and a mercury switch. The small force generated by the tube reliably operates the switch.

=== Vending and game machines ===
Mercury switches are still used in electro-mechanical systems where physical orientation of actuators or rotors is a factor. They are also commonly used in vending machines, and used to be common in slot machines and pinball machines, functioning as a tilt alarms that detect when someone tries to rock or tilt the machine to make it vend a product or affect a play outcome. They are less common in modern pinball machines due to concerns over mercury toxicity and pinball machines' appeal to children.

=== Bombs ===
A tilt switch can trigger a bomb. Mercury tilt switches can be found in some bomb and landmine fuzes, typically in the form of anti-handling devices, for example, a variant of the VS-50 mine.

== Toxicity ==
Since mercury is a toxic heavy metal, devices containing mercury switches must be treated as hazardous waste for disposal. Because it is now RoHS restricted, most modern applications have eliminated it. A metal ball and contact wires can directly replace it, but may require additional circuitry to eliminate switch bounce. Low-precision thermostats use a bimetal strip and a switch contact. Precision thermostats use a thermistor or silicon temperature sensor. Low-cost accelerometers replace the mercury tilt switch in precision applications.

In the United States, the Environmental Protection Agency (EPA) regulates the disposition and release of mercury. Individual states and localities may enact further regulations on the use or disposition of mercury.

== See also ==
- Mercury-arc valve, a rectifier device intended for high electrical voltages/currents
- Mercury battery, an electrochemical battery
- Mercury coulometer, an electro analytical chemistry device that determines the amount of matter transformed during a mercury reaction
- Mercury probe, an electrical probing device to sample for electrical characterization
- Mercury swivel commutator, an electrical circuit, current-reversing switch using the element mercury
- Mercury-wetted relay
- Mercury relay
