= Utilization categories =

Set of IEC standards

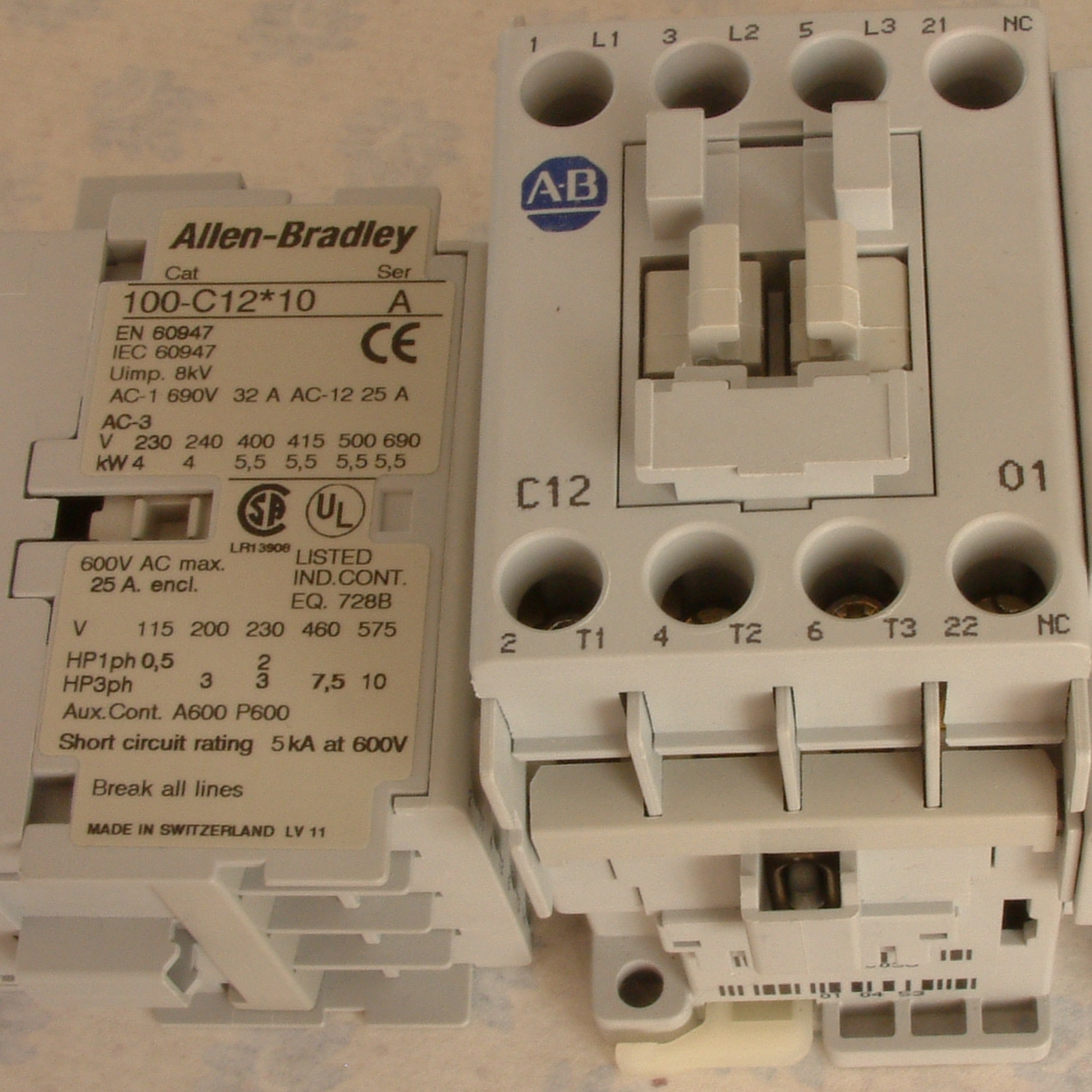
Usually utilization category is mentioned in most of the switch gear, with the above contactor stating to be used under AC1 - resistive load & AC3 for motor usage

In electrical engineering utilization categories are defined by IEC standards and indicate the type of electrical load and duty cycle of the loads to ease selection of contactors and relays.

== Definition ==
The utilization categories category for low-voltage switchgear defines the characteristic operating conditions for switchgear such as contactors, circuit-breakers, circuit-breaker-fuse units, contactor relays, etc. These devices are dimensioned for different electrical loads and for different operating conditions.

The characteristic of the load to be switched or controlled determines the requirements for the switchgear and its correct selection for the intended application. In particular, the stress on the switching path caused by current and voltage during switching on and off is of enormous importance. For example, the switch-on and switch-off current at resistance load corresponds to the continuous operating current, while, for example, squirrel cage motors consumes multiple of the rated operating current during switch-on and in the acceleration phase.

== Utilization categories in IEC standard ==
Contact load in amperes for heaters (AC1) and motors (AC3) can be found directly on the contactor. The "Utilization category" are mainly categorized in IEC 60947 in the following volume:

- Volume 1: General requirements
- Volume 2: Circuit-breakers
- Volume 3: Circuit-breakers, circuit-breakers, switch-disconnectors and switch-fuse units
- Volume 4-1: Contactors and motor starters; electromechanical contactors and motor starters[1]
- Volume 4-2: Contactors and motor starters - Semiconductor motor controllers and starters for a.c. voltage
- Volume 5-1: Control apparatus and switching elements - Electromechanical control apparatus[1]
- Volume 6-1: Multi-function switchgear and controlgear - Mains switches (categories AC-32A/B)
- Volume 6-2: Multi-function switchgear and controlgear - Control and protective switchgear (CPS)
- Volume 7-1: Auxiliary equipment; Terminal blocks for copper conductors
- Volume 7-2: Ancillary equipment; protective conductor terminal blocks for copper conductors

In addition, IEC/EN 61095 also defines categories for "household and similar applications".

== Table ==
The following table provides an overview of the various abbreviations. Within a utilization category, the suitable size may be selected for the respective type. This depends on the rated current, the rated voltage and the electrical load to be switched.

Utilization category	Typical application	Applicable IEC norm
AC-1	Non-inductive or slightly inductive loads, example: resistive furnaces, heaters	60947-4-1
AC-2	Slip-ring motors: switching off	60947-4-1
AC-3	Squirrel-cage motors: starting, switches off motors during running time	60947-4-1
AC-3e	Squirrel-cage high efficiency motors (IE3, IE4): starting, switches off motors during running time	60947-4-1
AC-4	Squirrel-cage motors: starting, plugging, inching	60947-4-1
AC-5a	Switching of discharge lamps	60947-4-1
AC-5b	Switching of incandescent lamps	60947-4-1
AC-6a	Switching of transformers	60947-4-1
AC-6b	Switching of capacitor banks	60947-4-1
AC-7a	Slightly inductive loads in household appliances: examples: mixers, blenders	60947-4-1; 61095
AC-7b	Motor-loads for household appliances: examples: fans, central vacuum	60947-4-1; 61095
AC-8a	Hermetic refrigerant compressor motor control with manual resetting overloads	60947-4-1
AC-8b	Hermetic refrigerant compressor motor control with automatic resetting overloads	60947-4-1
AC-12	Control of resistive loads and solid state loads with opto-coupler isolation	60947-5-2
AC-13	Control of solid state loads with transformer isolation	60947-5-1
AC-14	Control of small electromagnetic loads	60947-5-1
AC-15	Control of A.C. electromagnetic loads	60947-5-1
AC-20	Connecting and disconnecting under no-load conditions	60947-3
AC-21	Switching of resistive loads, including moderate overloads	60947-3
AC-22	Switching of mixed resistive and inductive loads, including moderate overloads	60947-3
AC-23	Switching of motor loads or other highly inductive loads	60947-3
AC-31A; AC-31B ³)	Non-inductive or weakly inductive loads	60947-6-1
AC-33A; AC33B³)	Motor loads or mixed loads including motors, resistors and up to 30% incandescent lamp load	60947-6-1
AC-35A; AC-35B ³)	Gas discharge lamp load	60947-6-1
AC-36A; AC36B ³)	Incandescent lamp load	60947-6-1
AC-40	Distribution circuits of mixed resistive and inductive loads	60947-6-2
AC-41	Non-inductive or weakly inductive loads, resistance furnaces	60947-6-2
AC-42	Slip ring motors: Starting, switching off	60947-6-2
AC-43	Squirrel cage motors: Starting, switching off during operation	60947-6-2
AC-44	Squirrel cage motors: Starting, counter-current braking ¹) or reversing ¹), typing ²)	60947-6-2
AC-45a	Switching of gas discharge lamps	60947-6-2
AC-45b	Switching incandescent lamps	60947-6-2
AC-51	Induction-free or slightly inductive loads, resistance furnaces	60947-4-3
AC-52a	Control of the stator winding of a slip-ring motor: 8-hour operation with starting currents for starting processes, maneuvering, operation	60947-4-2
AC-52b	Control of the stator winding of a slip ring motor: Intermittent operation	60947-4-2
AC-53a	Control of a squirrel cage motor: 8-hour operation with starting currents for starting processes, maneuvering, operation	60947-4-2
AC-53b	Control of a squirrel cage motor: Intermittent operation	60947-4-2
AC-55a	Switching of electrical controls of discharge lamps	60947-4-3
AC-55b	Switching incandescent lamps	60947-4-3
AC-56a	Switching transformers	60947-4-3
AC-56b	Switching of capacitor batteries	60947-4-3
AC-58a	Control of a hermetically sealed refrigeration compressor motor with automatic reset of overload releases: 8-hour operation with starting currents for starting, maneuvering, operation	60947-4-2
AC-58b	The control of a hermetically sealed refrigeration compressor motor with automatic reset of the overload trips: Intermittent operation	60947-4-2
AC-140	Control of small electromagnetic loads with holding current ≤ 0.2 A; e.g. contactor relays	60947-5-2
A	Protection of circuits, with no rated short-time withstand current	60947-3
B	Protection of circuits, with a rated short-time withstand current	60947-3
DC-1	Non Inductive or slightly inductive loads, resistance furnaces, heaters	60947-4-1
DC-3	Shunt-motors, starting, plugging(1), inching(2), dynamic braking of motors	60947-4-1
DC-5	Series-motors, starting, plugging(1), inching(2), dynamic braking of motors	60947-4-1
DC-6	Switching of incandescent lamps	60947-4-1
DC-12	Control of resistive loads and solid state loads with opto-coupler isolation	60947-5-1; 60947-5-2
DC-13	Control of D.C. electromagnetics	60947-5-1; 60947-5-2
DC-14	Control of D.C. electromagnetic loads having economy resistors in the circuit	60947-5-1
DC-20	Connecting and disconnecting under no-load conditions	60947-5-1
DC-21	Switching of resistive loads, including moderate overloads	60947-5-1
DC-22	Switching of mixed resistive and inductive loads, including moderate overloads (i.e. shunt motors)	60947-5-1
DC-23	Switching of highly inductive loads (i.e. series motors)	60947-5-1

== See also ==
- NEMA contact ratings
