= NEMA wattage label =

NEMA wattage labels are standardized labels defined by the National Electrical Manufacturers Association (NEMA) used on street lighting fixtures to indicate the wattage of the lamp for maintenance purposes. Additionally, various colors are used to identify what type of lamp the fixture uses.

A yellow sticker indicates the lamp is a sodium vapor lamp (HPS/LPS). A blue sticker indicates the lamp is mercury vapor (MV). A red sticker indicates the lamp is metal halide (MH). A sticker that is half-red and half-white indicates a pulse start metal halide lamp (PSMH). Green is also used on HPS units in Canada. White indicates that the fixture is of an LED type.

In addition to being colour-coded, newer NEMA stickers also state the lamp type abbreviation just below the lamp's wattage (e.g. HPS, LED).

== NEMA LED Letter Labels ==
- Philips Lumec Roadfocus — Small (RFS) Label
- Philips Lumec Roadfocus — Medium (RFM) Label
- Philips Lumec Roadfocus — Large (RFL) Label
- Philips Lumec RoadView Luminaire — Small (RVS) Label
- Philips Lumec RoadView Luminaire — Medium (RVM) Label
- Philips Lumec Roadfocus – Reduced Glare — Small (RFS-RG) Label
- Philips Lumec Roadfocus – Reduced Glare — Medium (RFM-RG) Label
- Philips Lumec Roadfocus – Reduced Glare — Large (RFL-RG) Label

== NEMA Labels ==
- "3" sticker—35 watts (HPS/LPS)—Rare
- "5S" sticker—45 watts (HPS/PSMH/LPS/MV)- Rare
- "5" sticker—50/55 watts (HPS/LPS)—Super common
- "7" sticker—70 watts (HPS/PSMH)—Very uncommon
- "9" sticker—90 watts (LPS)—Very uncommon
- "10" sticker—100 watts (MV/HPS/PSMH)—Very common
- "13" sticker—135 watts (LPS)—Common
- "15" sticker—150 watts (HPS/PSMH)—Very common
- "17" sticker—175 watts (MH/MV)—Common
- "18" sticker—180 watts (LPS)—Common
- "20" sticker—200 watts (HPS)—Common
- "25" sticker—250 watts (Mostly used in floodlights or on main roads) (MV/MH/HPS/PSMH)—Very common
- "31" sticker—310 watts (HPS)—Very uncommon
- "32" sticker—320 watts (PSMH)—Very uncommon
- "35" sticker—350 watts (PSMH)—Very uncommon
- "40" sticker—400 watts (MV/MH/HPS/PSMH)—Very common (Mostly used for floodlights)
- "No" sticker—600 watts (MH/HPS)—Lamps for commercial or industrial lighting are so rare that there isn’t any NEMA sticker. Most 600 watt HPS lamps are used for growing.
- "70" sticker—700 watts (MV)—Very uncommon
- "75" sticker—750 watts (HPS/PSMH)—Uncommon
- "X1" sticker—1,000 watts (MV/HPS/MH/PSMH)—Very common
- "X5" sticker—1,500 watts (MH)—Very common in stadium lighting; (HPS)—Uncommon. Mostly used for growing.
- "X9" sticker—2,500 watts (PSMH/MV/MH/HPS/LPS)—Common for big fixtures
- No sticker for 2,000 watts (MH)—Uncommon. Sometimes used in stadiums.

A label with a PS before the MH (e.g. 17 PSMH) on a MH sticker indicates that the fixture utilizes the newer pulse start technology, which uses different lamps than the older probe start technology. New Nema LED Sticker Uses For Led Street Light

With towns and cities rapidly fading out older High Pressure Sodium and Mercury Vapor lights, most towns use LEDs (Light Emitting Diodes.) These light have white stickers with a number on the top, such as 51 for 51 watts, and the letters LED in all caps on the bottom.
