= Mercury relay =

Relay using mercury metal

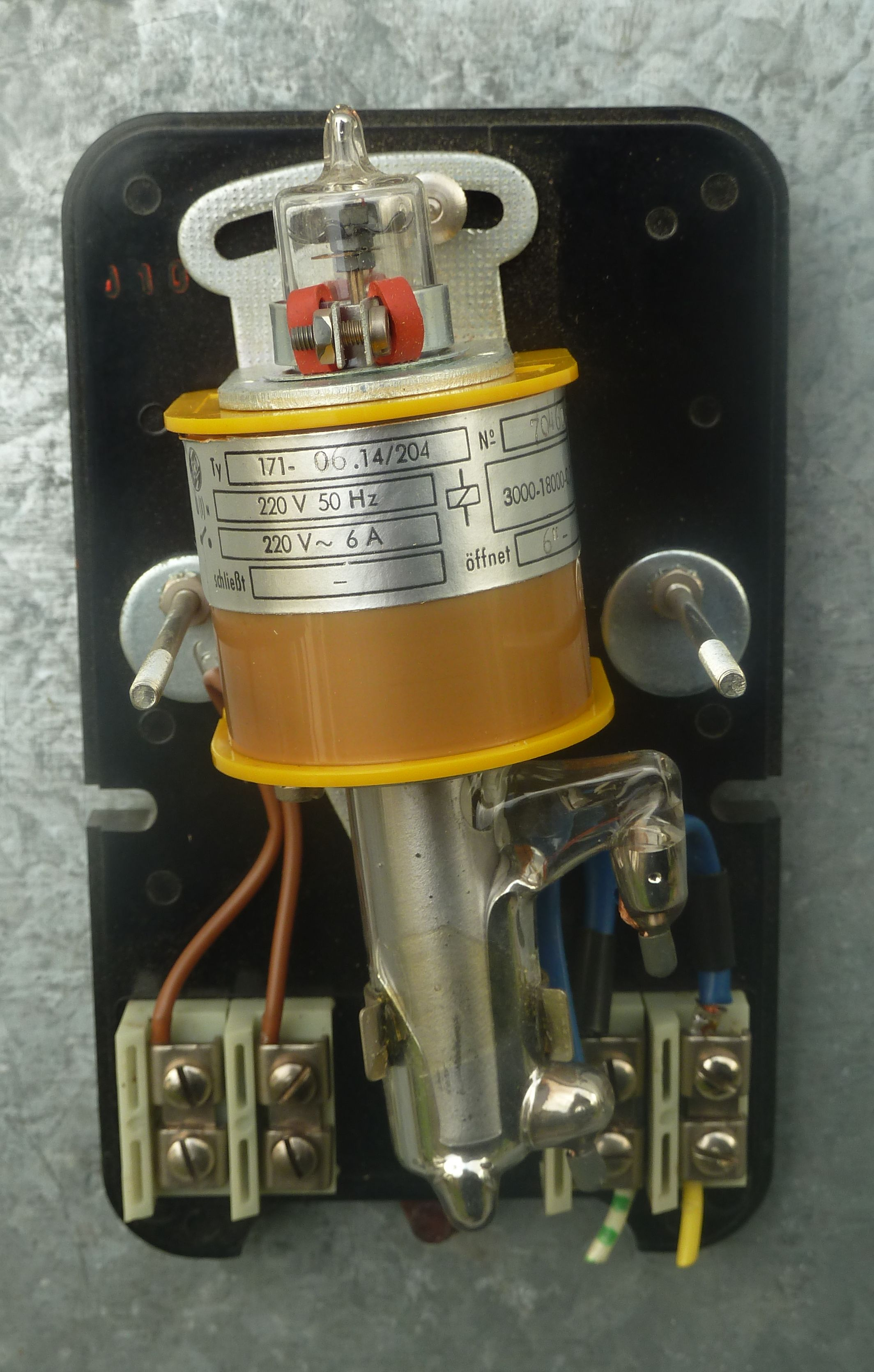
Normally closed mercury relay, with coil around top of tube and adjustable angle.

A mercury relay (mercury displacement relay, mercury contactor) is a relay that uses mercury as the switching element.

They are used as high-current switches or contactors, where contact erosion from constant cycling would be a problem for conventional relay contacts.

Owing to environmental considerations about the toxicity of mercury, mercury relays are mostly obsolete, though modern encapsulated units still have applications. They are generally being replaced by solid state relays.

== Operation ==
Mercury relays consist of a vertical (usually glass) tube containing liquid mercury. They have isolated contacts at the bottom of the tube and partway up, usually in a side arm of the glass. The relay works by displacement. A pool of mercury fills the lower portion of the tube, but is insufficient to bridge the contacts. A magnetic (Note: A magnetic material is one that may be attracted by a magnet, not necessarily one that may be magnetised itself.) slug of iron or steel is placed in the tube, where it sinks by gravity so as to displace the mercury. The displaced mercury rises in the tube, (Note: Steel is less dense than mercury, so that the slug floats on top of the mercury, rather than sinking through it. Despite this, the reduced volume of mercury displaced is still sufficient to bridge the contacts.) sufficiently to bridge the contacts and complete the circuit between them.

Around the top part of the tube is placed the coil. When energised, this coil attracts the slug, (Note: Iron (and steel) is magnetic and can be attracted, mercury is not.) lifting it upwards and out of the mercury pool. The mercury is no longer displaced, and thus flows downwards, away from the upper contact, and so the circuit opens. This allows for normally closed operation.

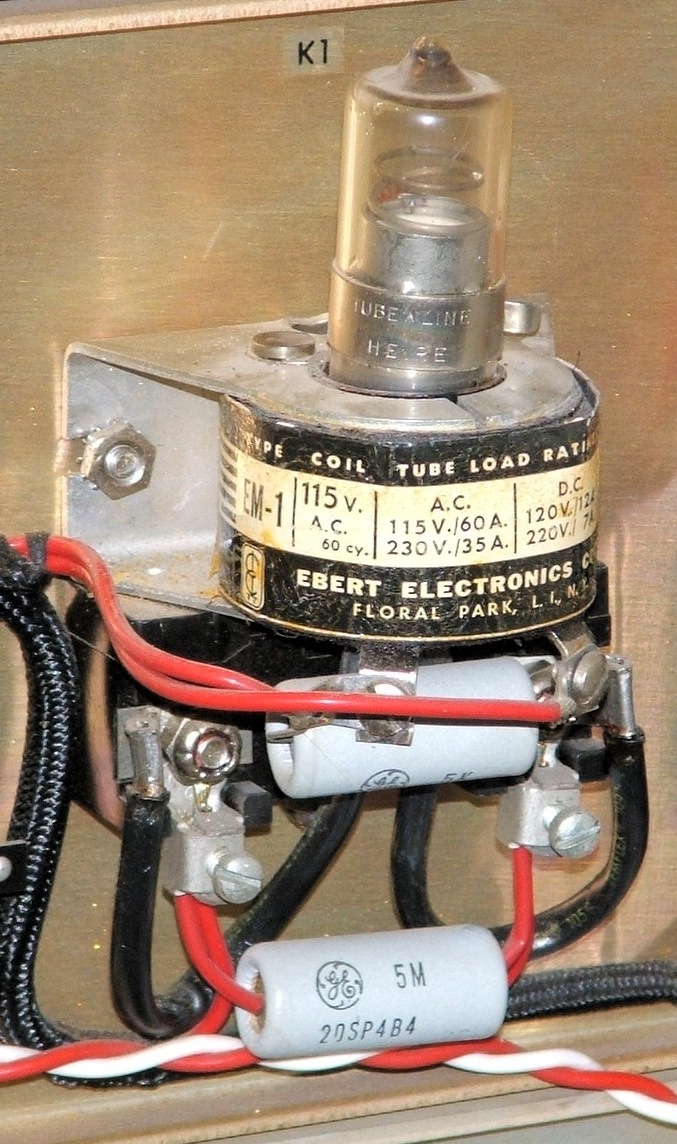
Normally open mercury relay, with coil around bottom of tube

For the more traditional normally open relay operation, the side contact is arranged somewhat higher up (or the volume of mercury is reduced), so that contact is not made when the iron slug is freely floating on the pool of mercury. The control coil is mounted below the rest level of the slug, and when energised draws down the slug deeper into the pool, thereby displacing additional mercury and thus raising the level to the previously uncovered side contact and closing the circuit.

The mercury relay thus allows for switching of higher currents with a small control current, for a large number of cycles. They are often installed into automatic controllers that required extended periods of unattended continuous switching operation. The mercury surface is self-restoring after an arc, and the contact resistance is low and stable.

The glass tube of a mercury relay must be mounted near-vertically. The sensitivity of these relays can be altered by adjusting their angle relative to vertical. As sensitivity depends upon angle, they are unsuitable for use on mobile equipment or with conditions of high vibration.

== Impulse relays ==
Mercury relays have also been produced as latching or impulse relays. The Lenning design uses a horizontal glass tube with two axially isolated pools of mercury. A conductive stirrup can bridge these to make the connection. The relay is controlled by the stirrup being rotated in and out of the pool along the horizontal axis of the tube. A weight on the stirrup's armature gives an over-centre action that provides the latching behaviour. A magnetic slug on the armature allows it to be rotated and controlled by an external electromagnet.

== High-speed operation ==
Owing to the mass of mercury moved during switching, compared to that of the armature and spring leaves of a conventional relay, the mercury relay is not a high-speed device. Despite this, the mercury relay does have a very low contact bounce time, in the sub-millisecond range. For some applications, particularly inductive loads, this alone may be a reason for their use – the timing of contact closure is not rapid, but the avoidance of bounce is valuable.

For high-speed use, the mercury-wetted relay is used instead. This combines the speed of a low-mass relay, together with the fast wetting of mercury contacts. A relay, usually a reed relay, has its contacts coated with a small quantity of mercury. This gives the low bounce advantage of mercury, although the current capacity is still limited to broadly that of the original reed relay.

== Other mercury switching devices ==
- Mercury-wetted relay
- Mercury switch
