= Shading coil =

Element used in an AC magnetic circuit

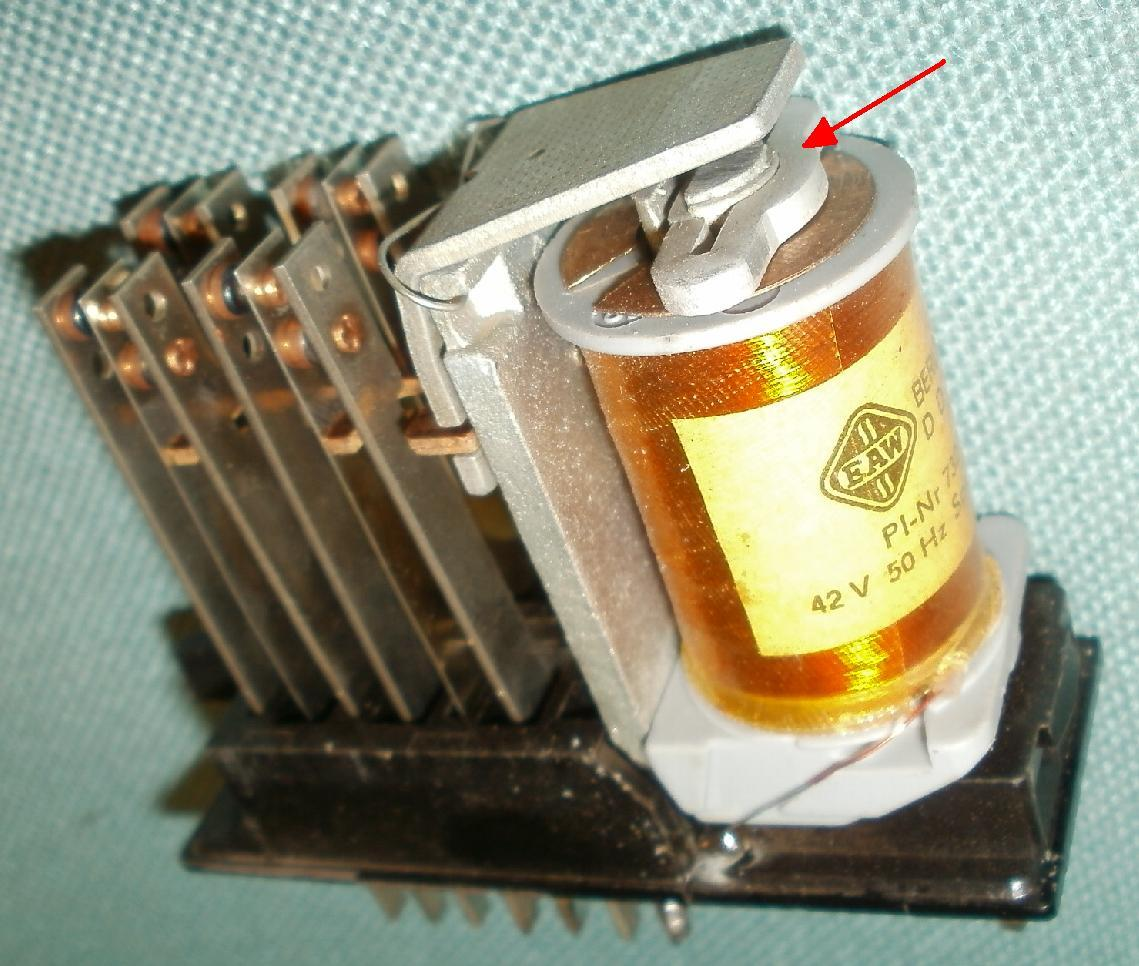
AC relay with shading coil (red arrow near top) for operating with AC

A shading coil or shading ring (Also called Frager spire or Frager coil) is one or more turns of electrical conductor (usually copper or aluminum) located in the face of the magnet assembly or armature of an alternating current solenoid, and only encircles part of the magnetic path. The alternating current in the energized primary coil induces an alternating current in the shading coil. This induced current creates an auxiliary magnetic flux which is 90 degrees out of phase from the magnetic flux created by the primary coil.

Frager spire or shading coil's purpose is to provide sizeable phase-shifted magnetic field (in blue) to keep the contactor on when the main coil flux (in red) passes through zero, avoiding unwanted chatter and mechanical destruction of the magnet and power contacts. .

Because of the 90 degree phase difference between the current in the shading coil and the current in the primary coil, the shading coil maintains a magnetic flux and hence a force between the armature and the assembly while the current in the primary coil crosses zero. Without this shading ring, the armature would tend to open each time the main flux goes through zero and create noise, heat and mechanical damages on the magnet faces, so it reduces bouncing or chatter of relay or power contacts.

== Shaded-pole AC motors ==
Operation of a two-pole squirrel-cage shaded-pole motor showing its rotating magnetic field

A shaded-pole motor is an AC single phase induction motor. Its includes an auxiliary winding composed of a copper ring called a shading ring (or shading coil with more than one turn).

The auxiliary winding produces a secondary magnetic flux which, along with the flux from the primary coil, forms a rotating magnetic field suitable for applying torque to and rotating the rotor. These devices are typically used as low-cost motors for microwave oven fans.
