= Motor controller =

Device for regulating the performance of a motor

A motor controller is a device or group of devices that can coordinate in a predetermined manner the performance of an electric motor. A motor controller might include a manual or automatic means for starting and stopping the motor, selecting forward or reverse rotation, selecting and regulating the speed, regulating or limiting the torque, and protecting against overloads and electrical faults. Motor controllers may use electromechanical switching, or may use power electronics devices to regulate the speed and direction of a motor.

== Applications ==
Motor controllers are used with both DC motors (direct current) and AC motors (alternating current). A controller includes means to connect the motor's windings to the electrical power supply, and may also include overload, over-current, and overheating protection and wiring (i.e. magnetic starter). A motor controller may also supervise the motor's field circuit, or detect conditions such as low supply voltage, incorrect polarity or incorrect phase sequence, or high motor temperature. Some motor controllers limit the inrush starting current, allowing the motor to accelerate itself and connected mechanical load more slowly than a direct connection. Motor controllers may be manual, requiring an operator to sequence a starting switch through steps to accelerate the load, or may be fully automatic, using internal timers or current sensors to accelerate the motor.

Some types of motor controllers also allow adjustment of the speed of the electric motor. For direct-current motors, the controller may adjust the voltage applied to the motor, or adjust the current flowing in the motor's field winding. Alternating current motors may have little or no speed response to adjusting terminal voltage, so controllers for alternating current instead adjust rotor circuit resistance (for wound rotor motors) or change the frequency of the AC applied to the motor for speed control using power electronic devices or electromechanical frequency changers.

The physical design and packaging of motor controllers is about as varied as that of electric motors themselves. A wall-mounted toggle switch with suitable ratings may be all that is needed for a household ventilation fan. Power tools and household appliances may have a trigger switch that only turns the motor on and off. Industrial motors may be more complex controllers connected to automation systems; a factory may have a large number of motor controllers grouped in a motor control center. Controllers for electric travelling cranes or electric vehicles may be mounted on the mobile equipment. The largest motor controllers are used with the pumping motors of pumped storage hydroelectric plants, and may carry ratings of tens of thousands of horsepower (kilowatts).

== Types of motor controller ==
Motor controllers can be manually, remotely or automatically operated. They may include only the means for starting and stopping the motor or they may include other functions.

Electric motors can be powered by AC or DC power sources. There are many type of AC and DC motors - namely brush, brushless, servo and stepper motors - depending on their mechanical construction.

A motor controller is connected to a power source, such as a battery pack or power supply, and control circuitry in the form of analog or digital input signals.

=== Motor starters ===
A small motor can be started by simply connecting it to power. A larger motor requires a specialized switching unit called a motor starter or motor contactor. When energized, a direct on line (DOL) starter immediately connects the motor terminals directly to the power supply. In smaller sizes a motor starter is a manually operated switch; larger motors, or those requiring remote or automatic control, use magnetic contactors. Very large motors running on medium voltage power supplies (thousands of volts) may use power circuit breakers as switching elements.

A direct on line (DOL) or across the line starter applies the full line voltage to the motor terminals. This is the simplest type of motor starter. A DOL motor starter often contains protection devices (see below), and in some cases, condition monitoring. Smaller sizes of direct on-line starters are manually operated; larger sizes use an electromechanical contactor to switch the motor circuit. Solid-state direct on line starters also exist.

A direct on line starter can be used if the high inrush current of the motor does not cause excessive voltage drop in the supply circuit. The maximum size of a motor allowed on a direct on line starter may be limited by the supply utility for this reason. For example, a utility may require rural customers to use reduced-voltage starters for motors larger than 10 kW.

DOL starting is sometimes used to start small water pumps, compressors, fans and conveyor belts. In the case of an asynchronous motor, such as the 3-phase squirrel-cage motor, the motor will draw a high starting current until it has run up to full speed. This starting current is typically 6-7 times greater than the full load current. To reduce the inrush current, larger motors will have reduced-voltage starters or adjustable-speed drives in order to minimise voltage dips to the power supply.

A reversing starter can connect the motor for rotation in either direction. Such a starter contains two DOL circuits — one for clockwise operation and the other for counter-clockwise operation, with mechanical and electrical interlocks to prevent simultaneous closure. For three phase motors, this is achieved by swapping the wires connecting any two phases. Single phase AC motors and direct-current motors often can be reversed by swapping two wires but this is not always the case.

Motor starters other than 'DOL' connect the motor through a resistance to reduce the voltage the motor coils get on start up. The resistance for this needs to be sized to the motor - and a quick source for a good resistance to use is another coil in the motor - i.e. series/parallel. In series gives a gentler start then switched to parallel for full power running. When this is done with three phase motors, it is commonly called a star-delta (US: Y-delta) starter. Old star-delta starters were manually operated and often incorporated an ammeter so the person operating the starter could see when the motor was up to speed by the fact the current it was drawing had stopped decreasing. More modern starters have built-in timers to switch from star to delta and are set by the electrical installer of the machine. The machine's operator simply presses a green button once and the rest of the start procedure is automated.

A typical starter includes protection against overload, both electrical and mechanical, and protection against 'random' starting - if, for instance, the power has been off and has just come back on. An acronym for this type of protection is TONVR - Thermal Overload, No Volt Release. It insists that the green button is pressed to start the motor. The green button switches on a solenoid which closes a contactor (i.e. switch) to primarily power the motor. It also powers the solenoid to keep the power turned on when the green button is released. In a power failure, the contactor opens turning itself and the motor off. The only way the motor can then be started is by pressing the green button. The contactor can be quickly tripped by the starter passing a very high current due to an electrical fault downstream of it in either the wiring to the motor or within the motor. The thermal overload protection consists of a heating element on each power wire which heats a bimetallic strip. The hotter the strip, the more it deflects to the point it pushes a trip bar which disconnects power to the contactor solenoid, turning everything off. Thermal overloads come in different range ratings and this should be chosen to match the motor. Within the range, they are adjustable enabling the installer to set it correctly for the given motor.

Which type for specific applications? DOL gives a quick start so is used more commonly with generally smaller motors. It is also used on machines with an uneven load such as piston type compressors where the full power of the motor is needed to get the piston past the compression stage - the actual working stage. Star-delta is generally used with larger motors or where either the motor is under no load at starting, very little load or a consistent load. It is particularly suited to motors driving machinery with heavy flywheels - to get the flywheels up to speed before the machine is engaged and driven by the flywheel.

=== Reduced voltage starters ===
Reduced-voltage or soft starters connect the motor to the power supply through a voltage reduction device and increases the applied voltage gradually or in steps. Two or more contactors may be used to provide reduced voltage starting of a motor. By using an autotransformer or a series inductance, a lower voltage is present at the motor terminals, reducing starting torque and inrush current. Once the motor has come up to some fraction of its full-load speed, the starter switches to full voltage at the motor terminals. Since the autotransformer or series reactor only carries the heavy motor starting current for a few seconds, the devices can be much smaller compared to continuously rated equipment. The transition between reduced and full voltage may be based on elapsed time, or triggered when a current sensor shows the motor current has begun to reduce. An autotransformer starter was patented in 1908.

Larger 3 phase induction motors can have their power reduced within the motor ! The motor is started 'DOL' with full voltage supplied to the field coils of the motor outer part ('stator'). The inner part ('rotor') has a current induced into it to once again react with the magnetic field generated by the stator. By breaking the rotor into parts and electrically connecting these parts to external resistances via slip rings and brushes as well as control contactors, the magnetic power of the rotor can be varied - i.e. reduced, for starting or low power running. Although a much more complex process, it means the currents (electrical loads) being switched are significantly lower than if reducing the power to the main feed of the motor.

A third way to achieve a very smooth progressive start is to dip resistance rods into a conductive liquid (e.g. mercury) which has a layer of insulative oil on the top. As the rods are lowered the resistance is gradually reduced.

A star delta starter is another type of Reduced-voltage starter in induction motor. A star delta starter will start a motor with a star connected stator winding. When motor reaches about 80% of its full load speed, it will begin to run in a delta connected stator winding. Star Delta Starter are two types. (1) Manual Operated Star Delta Starter, (2) Automatic Star Delta.

The manual operated star delta starter mainly consists of a TPDT switch which stands for Triple Pole Double Throw switch. This switch changes stator winding from star to delta. During starting condition stator winding is connected in the form of a star. Now we shall see how a star delta starter reduces the starting current of a three-phase induction motor.

The above function achieved by using a power contactor and timer in automatic star delta starter. The automatic star delta starter is manufactured from three contactors, a timer and a thermal overload. The contactors are smaller than the single contactor used in a direct on line starter as they are controlling winding currents only. The currents through the winding are 1/root 3 (58%) of the current in the line. There are two contactors that are close during run, often referred to as the main contractor and the delta contactor. These are AC3 rated at 58% of the current rating of the motor. The third contactor is the star contactor and that only carries star current while the motor is connected in star. The current in star is one third of the current in delta, so this contactor can be AC3 rated at one third (33%) of the motor rating.

The transition from star to delta can be an open transition or a closed transition. During open transition, the motor starter momentarily disconnects from the motor and reconnects in a delta configuration. In closed transition, the transition from the star to delta configuration is achieved without disconnecting the motor. In order to achieve that, an additional three-pole contactor and three resistors are required.

=== Adjustable-speed drives ===
An adjustable-speed drive (ASD) or variable-speed drive (VSD) is an interconnected combination of equipment that provides a means of driving and adjusting the operating speed of a mechanical load. An electrical adjustable-speed drive consists of an electric motor and a speed controller or power converter plus auxiliary devices and equipment. In common usage, the term "drive" is often applied to just the controller. Most modern ASDs and VSDs can also implement soft motor starting.

=== Intelligent controllers ===
An Intelligent Motor Controller (IMC) uses a microprocessor to control power electronic devices used for motor control. IMCs monitor the load on a motor and accordingly match motor torque to motor load. This is accomplished by reducing the voltage to the AC terminals and at the same time lowering current and kvar. This can provide a measure of energy efficiency improvement for motors that run under light load for a large part of the time, resulting in less heat, noise, and vibrations generated by the motor.

== Overload relays ==
A starter will contain protective devices for the motor. At a minimum this would include a thermal overload relay. The thermal overload is designed to open the starting circuit and thus cut the power to the motor in the event of the motor drawing too much current from the supply for an extended time. The overload relay has a normally closed contact which opens due to heat generated by excessive current flowing through the circuit. Thermal overloads have a small heating device that increases in temperature as the motor running current increases.

There are two types of thermal overload relay. In one type, a bimetallic strip located close to a heater deflects as the heater temperature rises until it mechanically causes the device to trip and open the circuit, cutting power to the motor should it become overloaded. A thermal overload will accommodate the brief high starting current of a motor while accurately protecting it from a running current overload. The heater coil and the action of the bi-metallic strip introduce a time delay that affords the motor time to start and settle into normal running current without the thermal overload tripping. Thermal overloads can be manually or automatically resettable depending on their application and have an adjuster that allows them to be accurately set to the motor run current.

A second type of thermal overload relay uses a eutectic alloy, like a solder, to retain a spring-loaded contact. When too much current passes through the heating element for too long a time, the alloy melts and the spring releases the contact, opening the control circuit and shutting down the motor. Since eutectic alloy elements are not adjustable, they are resistant to casual tampering but require changing the heater coil element to match the motor rated current.

Electronic digital overload relays containing a microprocessor may also be used, especially for high-value motors. These devices model the heating of the motor windings by monitoring the motor current. They can also include metering and communication functions.

== Loss of voltage protection ==
Starters using magnetic contactors usually derive the power supply for the contactor coil from the same source as the motor supply. An auxiliary contact from the contactor is used to maintain the contactor coil energized after the start command for the motor has been released. If a momentary loss of supply voltage occurs, the contactor will open and not close again until a new start command is given. This prevents restarting of the motor after a power failure. This connection also provides a small degree of protection against low power supply voltage and loss of a phase. However, since contactor coils will hold the circuit closed with as little as 80% of normal voltage applied to the coil, this is not a primary means of protecting motors from low voltage operation.

== Motor ride-through under voltage events ==
Some devices can be added so that during a voltage drop, the device maintains the current flow that is sufficient for the hold-in coil to keep the contacts closed. The circuit is designed allows current for the hold-in coil for voltage sags down to 15-25% voltage.

== Timed-sequenced schedule of the automatic restarts of multiple motors ==
After the electrical power has been restored (typically after a time delay of 30 to 60 seconds), then the time sequences of the automatic restarts of multiple motors are set to automatically begin.

Without a time sequenced schedule, any attempt to restart many motors simultaneously could lead to partial or total site wide power failure.

== Servo controllers ==
Servo controllers are a wide category of motor control. Common features are:

- precise closed loop position control
- fast acceleration rates
- precise speed control Servo motors may be made from several motor types, the most common being:
  - brushed DC motor
  - brushless DC motors
  - AC servo motors

Servo controllers use position feedback to close the control loop. This is commonly implemented with position encoders, resolvers, and Hall-effect sensors to directly measure the rotor's position.

Other position feedback methods measure the back EMF in the undriven coils to infer the rotor position, or detect the Kick-Back voltage transient (spike) that is generated whenever the power to a coil is instantaneously switched off. These are therefore often called "sensorless" control methods.

A servo may be controlled using pulse-width modulation (PWM). How long the pulse remains high (typically between 1 and 2 milliseconds) determines where the motor will try to position itself. Another control method is pulse and direction.

== Stepper motor controllers ==
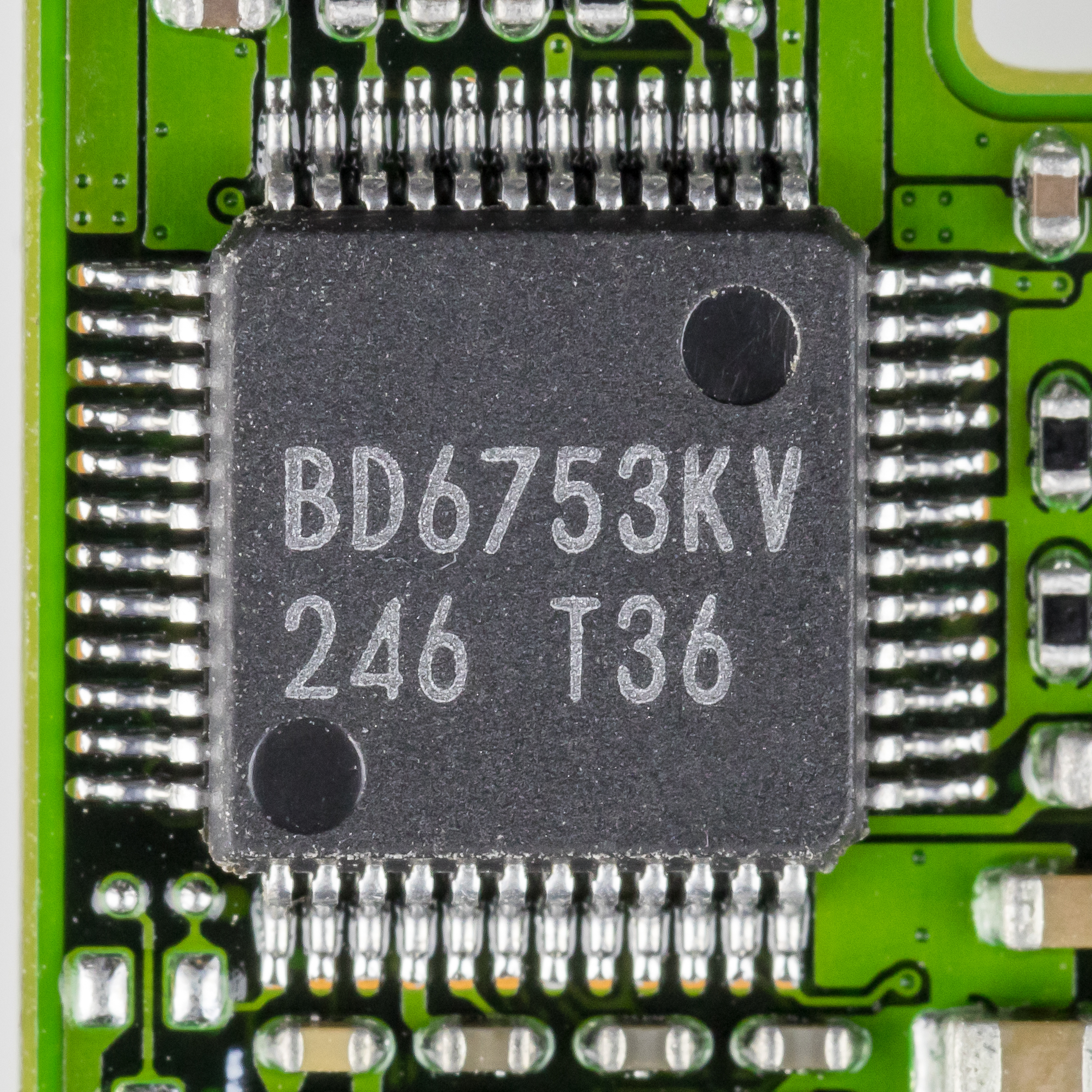
6-Channel System Lens Driver for Digital Still Cameras: Rohm BD6753KV

A stepper, or stepping, motor is a synchronous, brushless, high pole count, polyphase motor. Control is usually, but not exclusively, done open loop, i.e., the rotor position is assumed to follow a controlled rotating field. Because of this, precise positioning with steppers is simpler and cheaper than closed loop controls.

Modern stepper controllers drive the motor with much higher voltages than the motor nameplate rated voltage, and limit current through chopping. The usual setup is to have a positioning controller, known as an indexer, sending step and direction pulses to a separate higher voltage drive circuit which is responsible for commutation and current limiting.

== See also ==
- Motor control center (MCC)
