= Medical Imaging and Technology Alliance =

Medical Imaging & Technology Alliance (MITA) is a lobby for equipment manufacturers of medical imaging machinery.

== Standards ==
MITA is also the source of the DICOM standard and the XR series of medical imaging and radiation dose standards:

- XR 26-2012 Access Controls for Computer Tomography: Identification, Interlocks, and Logs
- XR 27-2012 User QC Standard
- XR 24-2008 Primary User Controls for Interventional Angiography X-ray Equipment
- XR 23-2006 Quality Control Manual Template for Manufacturers of Hardcopy Output Devices Labeled for Final Interpretation in Full-Field Digital mammography (FFDM)
- XR 22-2006 Quality Control Manual Template for Manufacturers of Displays and Workstations Labeled for Final Interpretation in Full-Field Digital Mammography (FFDM)
- XR 21-2000 Characteristics of and Test Procedures for a Phantom to Benchmark Cardiac Fluoroscopic and Photographic Performance
- XR 19-1993 (R1999) Electrical, Thermal and Loading Characteristics of X-ray Tubes Used for Medical Diagnosis
- XR 18-1993 (R1999) Test Standard for the Determination of the Radial Image Distortion of an X-ray image intensifier (XRII) System
- XR 17-1993 (R1999) Test Standard for the Measurement of the Image Signal Uniformity of an X-ray Image Intensifier (XRII) System
- XR 16-1991 (R1996, R2001) Test Standard for the Determination of the System Contrast Ratio (SCR) and the System Veiling Glare Index (SVGI) of an X-ray Image Intensifier (XRII) System
- XR 15-1991 (R1996, R2001) Test Standard for the Determination of the Visible Entrance Field Size of an X-R=ray Image Intensifier (XRII) System
- XR 14-1990 (R1995, R2000) Recommended Practices for Load-Bearing Mechanical Assemblies Used in Diagnostic Imaging
- NEMA XR 13-1990 (R1995, R2000) Mechanical Safety Standard for Power Driven Motions of Electromedical Equipment
- XR 11-1993 (R1999) Test Standard for the Determination of the Limiting Spatial Resolution of X-ray Image Intensifier Systems
- XR 10-1986 (R1992, R1998, R2003) Measurement of the Maximum Symmetrical Radiation Field from a Rotating Anode X-ray Tube Used for Medical Diagnosis
- XR 9-1984 (R1994, R2000) Power Supply Guidelines for X-ray Machines
- XR 7-1995 (R2000) Electrical, Thermal and Loading Characteristics of X-ray Tubes Used for Medical Diagnosis
- XR 5-1992 (R1999) Measurement of Dimensions and Properties of Focal Spots of Diagnostic X-ray Tubes
