= National Electrical Manufacturers Association =

American trade organization

- Abbreviation: NEMA
- Founded: 1926; 100 years ago
- Tax ID no.: 13-1085700
- Legal status: 501(c)(6) trade association
- Headquarters: Rosslyn, Virginia, United States
- Coordinates: 38.893526°N 77.072578°W
- Chairman, Board of Governors: Annette Clayton
- President, Chief Executive Officer: Debra Phillips
- Subsidiaries: National Electrical Manufacturers Association Political Action Committee (527)
- Revenue: $22,508,708 (2017)
- Expenses: $22,594,548 (2017)
- Endowment: $13,130,745 (2017)
- Employees: 88 (2017)
- Volunteers: 2,366 (2017)
- Website: www.nema.org

The National Electrical Manufacturers Association (NEMA) is the largest trade association of electrical equipment manufacturers in the United States. Founded in 1926, it advocates for the industry and publishes standards for electrical products. Notably, the form of US household electrical outlets and plugs is specified by NEMA.

== Overview ==
NEMA was founded in 1926 and has its headquarters in Rosslyn, Virginia, in the Washington metropolitan area. Its approximately 350 member companies manufacture products used in the electricity generation, power transmission, distribution, control, and end use of electricity. These products are used in utility, industrial, commercial, institutional, and residential applications.

The association's Medical Imaging and Technology Alliance (MITA) division represents manufacturers of cutting-edge medical diagnostic imaging equipment, including MRI, CT, x-ray, and ultrasound products. Other major end markets include building systems, electrical infrastructure, industrial systems, lighting systems and utility systems.

Their combined industries account for 360,000 American jobs in more than 7,000 facilities in every state. Their industry produces $106 billion in shipments of electrical equipment and medical imaging technologies per year, with $36 billion in exports. NEMA also has offices in Mexico City.

== Activities ==
In addition to lobbying activities, NEMA has published nearly 1,000 electrical and medical imaging standards, application guides, white papers, and technical papers. Among its major standards are those for electrical enclosures, motors, and magnet wire, AC plugs and receptacles; the NEMA connectors are universal in North America and also used by some other countries.

== See also ==
- NEMA contact ratings
- NEMA enclosure types
- NEMA stepper motor
- NEMA wattage label
