= NEMA contact ratings =

NEMA contact ratings are how much current at a rated voltage a relay or other pilot device can switch. The current rating of smaller NEMA contactors or their auxiliaries are defined by NEMA ICS 5: Industrial Control and Systems, Control Circuit and Pilot Devices standard. The nomenclature is a letter followed by a three-digit number, the letter designates the current rating of the contacts and the current type (i.e., AC or DC) and the number designates the maximum voltage design values.

== AC Contact Ratings ==
Contact Rating Designation	Thermal Current	Voltage
A150	10	150
A300	10	300
A600	10	600
B150	5	150
B300	5	300
B600	5	600
C150	2.5	150
C300	2.5	300
C600	2.5	600
D150	1	150
D300	1	300
E150	0.5	150

== DC Contact Ratings ==
Contact Rating Designation	Thermal Current	Voltage	Voltamperes
N150	10	150	275
N300	10	300	275
N600	10	600	275
P150	5	150	138
P300	5	300	138
P600	5	600	138
Q150	2.5	150	
Q300	2.5	300	
Q600	2.5	600	
R150	1	150	
R300	1	300	

== See also ==
- Utilization categories
