= Leakage inductance =

Magnetic perturbation of imperfectly coupled transformers

Leakage inductance derives from the electrical property of an imperfectly coupled transformer whereby each winding behaves as if a self-inductance is in series with the winding's respective resistance. The leakage inductance accounts for leakage flux that does not link with all turns of each coupled winding.

Leakage reactance is usually the most important element of a power system transformer due to power factor, voltage drop, reactive power consumption and fault current considerations.

Leakage inductance depends on the geometry of the core and the windings. Voltage drop across the leakage reactance often degrades load regulation with varying transformer load. But it can also be useful for harmonic isolation (attenuating higher frequencies) of some loads.

Leakage inductance applies to any imperfectly coupled magnetic circuit device including motors.

== Leakage inductance and inductive coupling factor ==
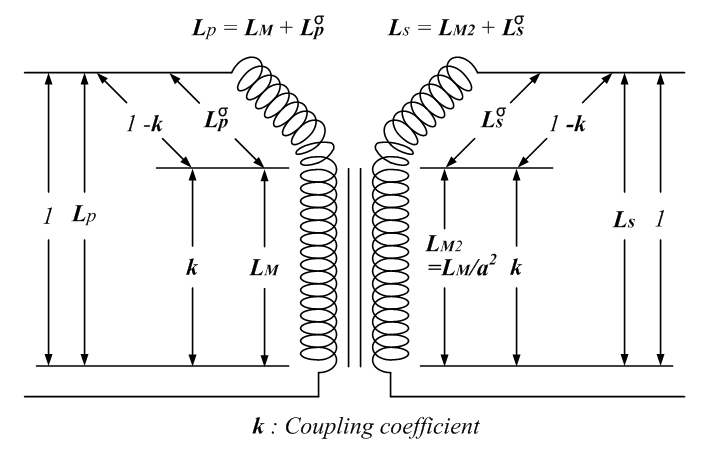
Fig. 1 L_{P}^{σ}and L_{S}^{σ} are primary and secondary leakage inductances expressed in terms of inductive coupling coefficient $k$ under open-circuited conditions.

The magnetic circuit's flux that does not interlink both windings is the leakage flux corresponding to primary leakage inductance L_{P}^{σ} and secondary leakage inductance L_{S}^{σ}. Referring to Fig. 1, these leakage inductances are defined in terms of transformer winding open-circuit inductances and associated coupling coefficient or coupling factor $k$.

The primary open-circuit self-inductance is given by

$L_{oc}^{pri}=L_P=L_M+L_P^\sigma$ ------ (Eq. 1.1a)

where

$L_P^\sigma=L_P\cdot{(1-k)}$ ------ (Eq. 1.1b)
$L_M=L_P\cdot{k}$ ------ (Eq. 1.1c)

and

- $L_{oc}^{pri}=L_P$ is primary self-inductance
- $L_P^\sigma$ is primary leakage inductance
- $L_M$ is magnetizing inductance
- $k$ is inductive coupling coefficient

Measuring basic transformer inductances & coupling factor

Transformer self-inductances $L_P$ & $L_S$ and mutual inductance $M$ are, in additive and subtractive series connection of the two windings, given by,

in additive connection,
$L_{ser}^{+}=L_P+L_S+2M$, and,

in subtractive connection,
$$L_{ser}^{-}=L_P+L_S-2M$$

such that these transformer inductances can be determined from the following three equations:

$$L_{ser}^{+}-L_{ser}^{-}=4M$$
$$L_{ser}^{+}+L_{ser}^{-}=2 \cdot (L_{P}+L_{S})$$
$$L_P=a^2.L_S$$.

The coupling factor is derived from the inductance value measured across one winding with the other winding short-circuited according to the following:

Per Eq. 2.7,

$L_{sc}^{pri}=L_S\cdot{(1-k^2)}$ and $L_{sc}^{sec}=L_P\cdot{(1-k^2)}$

Such that

$$k=\sqrt{1-\frac{L_{sc}^{pri}}{L_S}}=\sqrt{1-\frac{L_{sc}^{sec}}{L_P}}$$

The Campbell bridge circuit can also be used to determine transformer self-inductances and mutual inductance using a variable standard mutual inductor pair for one of the bridge sides.

It therefore follows that the open-circuit self-inductance and inductive coupling factor $k$ are given by

$L_{oc}^{sec}=L_S=L_{M2}+L_S^\sigma$ ------ (Eq. 1.2), and,
$k=\frac {\left | M\right|}{\sqrt{L_PL_S}}$, with 0 < $k$ < 1 ------ (Eq. 1.3)

where

$$L_S^\sigma=L_S\cdot{(1-k)}$$
$$L_{M2}=L_S\cdot {k}$$

and

- $M$ is mutual inductance
- $L_{oc}^{sec}=L_S$ is secondary self-inductance
- $L_S^\sigma$ is secondary leakage inductance
- $L_{M2}= L_M/a^2$ is magnetizing inductance referred to the secondary
- $k$ is inductive coupling coefficient
- $a \equiv \sqrt {\frac {L_p} {L_s}} \approx N_P/N_S$ (Note: Equality is approached when the leakage inductances are small.) is the approximate turns ratio

The electric validity of the transformer diagram in Fig. 1 depends strictly on open-circuit conditions for the respective winding inductances considered. More generalized circuit conditions are as developed in the next two sections.

== Inductive leakage factor and inductance ==
A nonideal linear two-winding transformer can be represented by two mutual inductance-coupled circuit loops linking the transformer's five impedance constants as shown in Fig. 2.

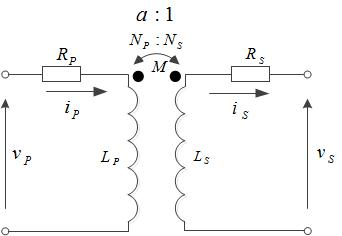
Fig. 2 Nonideal transformer circuit diagram

where

- M is mutual inductance
- $R_P$ & $R_S$ are primary and secondary winding resistances
- Constants $M$, $L_P$, $L_S$, $R_P$ & $R_S$ are measurable at the transformer's terminals
- Coupling factor $k$ is defined as

$k=\left | M\right |/\sqrt{L_PL_S}$, where 0 < $k$ < 1 ------ (Eq. 2.1)

The winding turns ratio $a$ is in practice given as

$a=\sqrt{L_P/L_S}=N_P/N_S\approx v_P/v_S \approx i_S/i_P=$ ------ (Eq. 2.2).

where

- N_{P} & N_{S} are primary and secondary winding turns
- v_{P} & v_{S} and i_{P} & i_{S} are primary & secondary winding voltages & currents.

The nonideal transformer's mesh equations can be expressed by the following voltage and flux linkage equations,

$v_P=R_P \cdot i_P+\frac{d\Psi{_P}}{dt}$ ------ (Eq. 2.3)
$v_S=-R_S \cdot i_S-\frac{d\Psi{_S}}{dt}$ ------ (Eq. 2.4)
$\Psi_P=L_P \cdot i_P-M \cdot i_S$ ------ (Eq. 2.5)
$\Psi_S=L_S \cdot i_S-M \cdot i_P$ ------ (Eq. 2.6),

where

- $\Psi$ is flux linkage
- $\frac {d \Psi}{d t}$ is derivative of flux linkage with respect to time.

These equations can be developed to show that, neglecting associated winding resistances, the ratio of a winding circuit's inductances and currents with the other winding short-circuited and at open-circuit test is as follows,

$\sigma=1-\frac{M^2}{L_PL_S}=1-k^2\approx\frac{L_{sc}}{L_{oc}}\approx \frac{L_{sc}^{sec}}{L_P}\approx\frac{L_{sc}^{pri}}{L_S}\approx\frac{i_{oc}}{i_{sc}}$ ------ (Eq. 2.7),

where,

- i_{oc} & i_{sc} are open-circuit and short-circuit currents
- L_{oc} & L_{sc} are open-circuit and short-circuit inductances.
- $\sigma$ is the inductive leakage factor or Heyland factor
- $L_{sc}^{pri}$ & $L_{sc}^{sec}$ are primary and secondary short-circuited leakage inductances.

The transformer inductance can be characterized in terms of the three inductance constants as follows,

$L_M=a{M}$ ------ (Eq. 2.8)
$L_P^\sigma=L_P-a{M}$ ------ (Eq. 2.9)
$L_S^\sigma=L_S-{M}/a$ ------ (Eq. 2.10) ,

where,

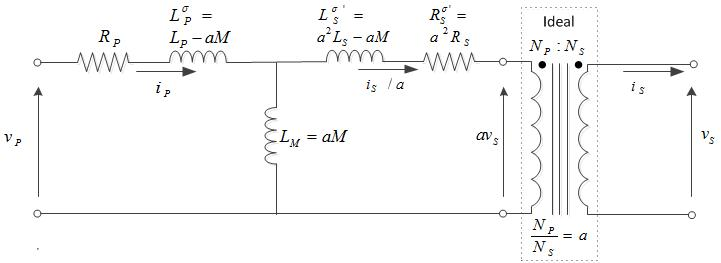
Fig. 3 Nonideal transformer equivalent circuit

- L_{M} is magnetizing inductance, corresponding to magnetizing reactance X_{M}
- L_{P}^{σ} & L_{S}^{σ} are primary & secondary leakage inductances, corresponding to primary & secondary leakage reactances X_{P}^{σ} & X_{S}^{σ}.

The transformer can be expressed more conveniently as the equivalent circuit in Fig. 3 with secondary constants referred (i.e., with prime superscript notation) to the primary,

$$L_S^{\sigma\prime}=a^2L_S-aM$$
$$R_S^\prime=a^2R_S$$
$$V_S^\prime=aV_S$$
$$I_S^\prime=I_S/a$$.

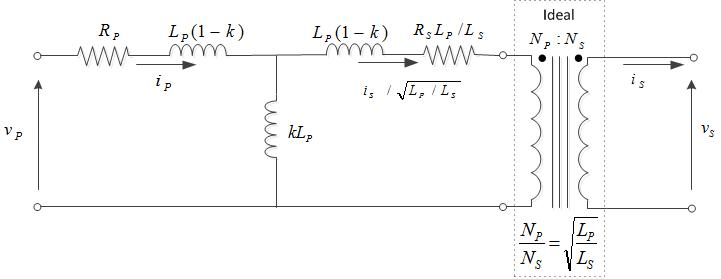
Fig. 4 Nonideal transformer equivalent circuit in terms of coupling coefficient k

Since

$k=M/\sqrt{L_PL_S}$ ------ (Eq. 2.11)

and

$a=\sqrt{L_P/L_S}$ ------ (Eq. 2.12),

we have

$aM=\sqrt{L_P/L_S} \cdot k \cdot \sqrt{L_PL_S}=kL_P$ ------ (Eq. 2.13),

which allows expression of the equivalent circuit in Fig. 4 in terms of winding leakage and magnetizing inductance constants as follows,

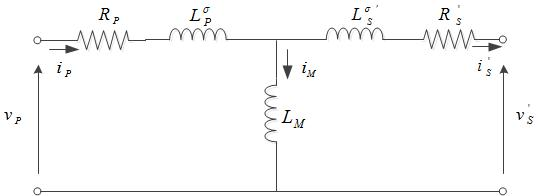
Fig. 5 Simplified nonideal transformer equivalent circuit

$L_P^\sigma=L_S^{\sigma\prime}=L_P \cdot (1-k)$ ------ (Eq. 2.14 $\equiv$ Eq. 1.1b)
$L_M=kL_P$ ------ (Eq. 2.15 $\equiv$ Eq. 1.1c).

The nonideal transformer in Fig. 4 can be shown as the simplified equivalent circuit in Fig. 5, with secondary constants referred to the primary and without ideal transformer isolation, where,

$i_M = i_P - i_S^'$ ------ (Eq. 2.16)
- $i_M$ is magnetizing current excited by flux Φ_{M} that links both primary and secondary windings
- $i_P$ is the primary current
- $i_S'$ is the secondary current referred to the primary side of the transformer.

== Refined inductive leakage factor ==
Refined inductive leakage factor derivation

a. Per Eq. 2.1 & IEC IEV 131-12-41 inductive coupling factor $k$ is given by

$k=\left | M\right | /\sqrt{L_PL_S}$ --------------------- (Eq. 2.1):

b. Per Eq. 2.7 & IEC IEV 131-12-42 Inductive leakage factor $\sigma$ is given by

$\sigma=1-k^2=1-\frac{M^2}{L_PL_S}$ ------ (Eq. 2.7) & (Eq. 3.7a)

c. $\frac{M^2}{L_PL_S}$ multiplied by $\frac{a^2}{a^2}$ gives

$\sigma=1-\frac{a^2M^2}{L_Pa^2L_S}$ ----------------- (Eq. 3.7b)

d. Per Eq. 2-8 & knowing that $a^2L_S=L_S^\prime$

$\sigma=1-\frac{L_M^2}{L_PL_S^\prime}$ ---------------------- (Eq. 3.7c)

e. $\frac{L_M^2}{L_PL_S^\prime}$ multiplied by $\frac{L_M.L_M}{L_M^2}$ gives

$\sigma=1-\frac{1}{\frac{L_P}{L_M}.\frac{L_S^\prime}{L_M}}$ ------------------ (Eq. 3.7d)

f. Per Eq. 3.5 $\approx$ Eq. 1.1b & Eq. 2.14 and Eq. 3.6 $\approx$ Eq. 1.1b & Eq. 2.14:

$\sigma=1-\frac{1}{(1+\sigma_P)(1+\sigma_S)}$ --- (Eq.3.7e)

All equations in this article assume steady-state constant-frequency waveform conditions the $k$ & $\sigma$ values of which are dimensionless, fixed, finite & positive but less than 1.

Referring to the flux diagram in Fig. 6, the following equations hold:

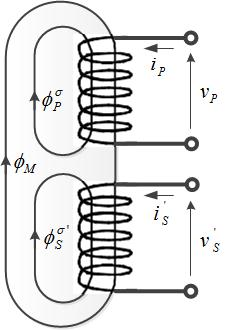
Fig. 6 Magnetizing and leakage flux in a magnetic circuit

σ_{P} = Φ_{P}^{σ}/Φ_{M} = L_{P}^{σ}/L_{M} ------ (Eq. 3.1 $\approx$ Eq. 2.7)

In the same way,

σ_{S} = Φ_{S}^{σ'}/Φ_{M} = L_{S}^{σ'}/L_{M} ------ (Eq. 3.2 $\approx$ Eq. 2.7)

And therefore,

Φ_{P} = Φ_{M} + Φ_{P}^{σ} = Φ_{M} + σ_{P}Φ_{M} = (1 + σ_{P})Φ_{M} ------ (Eq. 3.3)

Φ_{S}^{'} = Φ_{M} + Φ_{S}^{σ'} = Φ_{M} + σ_{S}Φ_{M} = (1 + σ_{S})Φ_{M} ------ (Eq. 3.4)

L_{P} = L_{M} + L_{P}^{σ} = L_{M} + σ_{P}L_{M} = (1 + σ_{P})L_{M} ------ (Eq. 3.5 $\approx$ Eq. 1.1b & Eq. 2.14)

L_{S}^{'} = L_{M} + L_{S}^{σ'} = L_{M} + σ_{S}L_{M} = (1 + σ_{S})L_{M} ------ (Eq. 3.6 $\approx$ Eq. 1.1b & Eq. 2.14),

where

- σ_{P} & σ_{S} are, respectively, primary leakage factor & secondary leakage factor

- Φ_{M} & L_{M} are, respectively, mutual flux & magnetizing inductance

- Φ_{P}^{σ} & L_{P}^{σ} are, respectively, primary leakage flux & primary leakage inductance

- Φ_{S}^{σ'} & L_{S}^{σ'} are, respectively, secondary leakage flux & secondary leakage inductance both referred to the primary.

The leakage ratio σ can thus be refined in terms of the interrelationship of above winding-specific inductance and Inductive leakage factor equations as follows:

$\sigma=1-\frac{M^2}{L_PL_S}=1-\frac{a^2M^2}{L_Pa^2L_S}=1-\frac{L_M^2}{L_PL_S{^'}}=1-\frac{1}{\frac{L_P}{L_M}.\frac{L_S^'}{L_M}} =1-\frac{1}{(1+\sigma_P)(1+\sigma_S)}$ ------ (Eq. 3.7a to 3.7e).

== Applications ==
Leakage inductance can be an undesirable property, as it causes the voltage to change with loading.

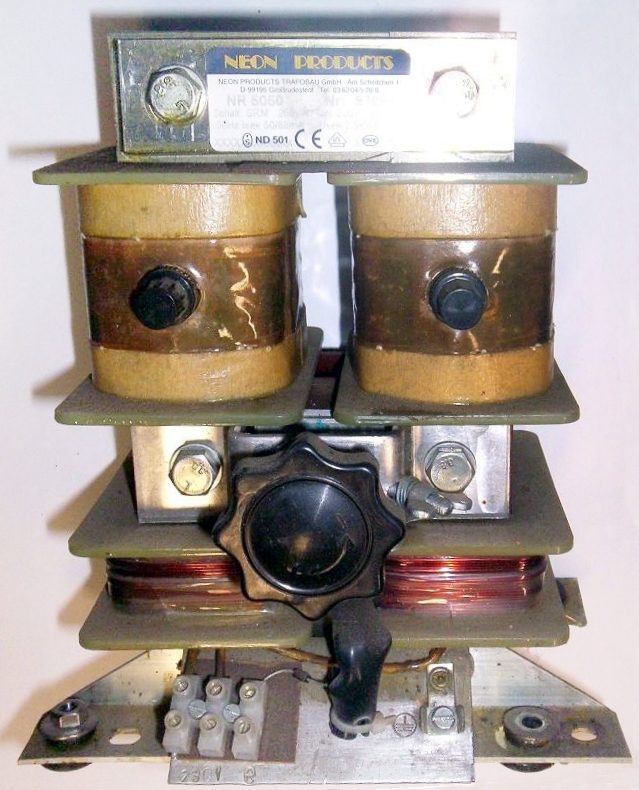
High leakage transformer

In many cases it is useful. Leakage inductance has the useful effect of limiting the current flows in a transformer (and load) without itself dissipating power (excepting the usual non-ideal transformer losses). Transformers are generally designed to have a specific value of leakage inductance such that the leakage reactance created by this inductance is a specific value at the desired frequency of operation. In this case, actually working useful parameter is not the leakage inductance value but the short-circuit inductance value.

Commercial and distribution transformers rated up to say 2,500 kVA are usually designed with short-circuit impedances of between about 3% and 6% and with a corresponding $X/R$ ratio (winding reactance/winding resistance ratio) of between about 3 and 6, which defines the percent secondary voltage variation between no-load and full load. Thus for purely resistive loads, such transformers' full-to-no-load voltage regulation will be between about 1% and 2%.

High leakage reactance transformers are used for some negative resistance applications, such as neon signs, where a voltage amplification (transformer action) is required as well as current limiting. In this case the leakage reactance is usually 100% of full load impedance, so even if the transformer is shorted out it will not be damaged. Without the leakage inductance, the negative resistance characteristic of these gas discharge lamps would cause them to conduct excessive current and be destroyed.

Transformers with variable leakage inductance are used to control the current in arc welding sets. In these cases, the leakage inductance limits the current flow to the desired magnitude. Transformer leakage reactance has a large role in limiting circuit fault current within the maximum allowable value in the power system.

In addition, the leakage inductance of a HF-transformer can replace a series inductor in a resonant converter. In contrast, connecting a conventional transformer and an inductor in series results in the same electric behavior as of a leakage transformer, but this can be advantageous to reduce the eddy current losses in the transformer windings caused by the stray field.

== See also ==
- Blocked rotor test
- Circle diagram
- Mutual inductance
- Steinmetz equivalent circuit
- Short-circuit inductance
- Short-circuit test
- Voltage regulation
