= Langston motor =

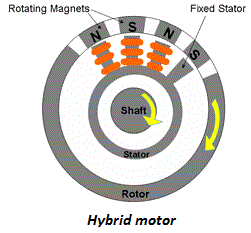
Hybrid motor with 2 rotors

A Langston or hybrid type of an asynchronous motor is an AC electric motor in which the electric current in the rotor needed to produce torque is obtained by electromagnetic induction from the magnetic field of the stator windings. The motor consists of two stators or two rotors. When the hybrid motor consists of two stators the rotor is placed in the center and similarly when the motor has two rotors then the stator is placed in the center. The windings are similar to that of an induction machine combined with a synchronous machine. A hybrid motor can, therefore, be made without electrical connections to the rotors as are found in universal and DC motors. The motors are fairly new and there is still a lot of research ongoing to investigate if this could be used to drive machines without using V/f control.

The motor is named after the hometown of its creator, Langston in Alabama. The creator of the Langston motor prefers to stay anonymous, but it is known that he is in some way associated to the Yuri Roll company.

== See also ==
- Circle diagram
- Premium efficiency
- Variable refrigerant flow
