= Premium efficiency =

Premium efficiency, when used in reference to specific types of Electric Motors (with a rotating shaft), is a class of motor efficiency.

As part of a concerted effort worldwide to reduce energy consumption, CO_{2} emissions and the impact of industrial operations on the environment, various regulatory authorities in many countries have introduced, or are planning, legislation to encourage the manufacture and use of higher efficiency electrically powered motors. This article looks at the development of the premium efficiency standard (IE3) and premium efficiency motors (PEMs) and associated environmental, legal and energy-related topics.

== History ==
The oil crisis and the worldwide need for more power, more electrical power, and consequently more power stations have raised energy conservation awareness.

In 1992 the U.S. Congress, as part of the Energy Policy Act (EPAct) set minimum efficiency levels (see Table B-1) for electric motors.

In 1998 the European Committee of Manufacturers of Electrical Machines and Power systems (CEMEP) issued a voluntary agreement of motor manufacturers on efficiency classification, with three efficiency classes:

- Eff 1 for High Efficiency
- Eff 2 for Standard Efficiency
- Eff 3 for Low Efficiency

== Premium efficiency electrical motors ==
The term premium efficiency as discussed here relates to a class of motor efficiency. It is thought necessary to introduce this term associated with motors because of forthcoming legislation in the EU, USA and other countries regarding the future mandatory use of premium-efficiency squirrel cage induction type motors in defined equipment.

== Reducing energy consumption and CO_{2} emissions ==
Several statements have been made regarding motor use and the advantages of using premium-efficiency or higher efficiency motors. These include:

Based on U.S. Department of Energy data, it is estimated that the National Electrical Manufacturers Association (NEMA) premium-efficiency motor program would save 5.8 terawatts of electricity and prevent the release of nearly 80 million metric tons of carbon into the atmosphere over the next ten years. This is equivalent to keeping 16 million cars off the road.

Roughly 30 million new electric motors are sold each year for industrial purposes. Some 300 million motors are in use in industry, infrastructure and large buildings. These electric motors are responsible for 40% of global electricity used to drive pumps, fans, compressors and other mechanical traction equipment. Motor technology has evolved over the last few decades. Superior so-called "premium" products are now available, ready to change the market toward energy efficiency and to contribute in lowering greenhouse gas emissions worldwide.

With using best practice energy efficiency of electrical motors can be improved by 20% to 30% on average. Most improvements have a pay back time of 1 to 3 years. This can result in a potential impact on reduction of global greenhouse gas emissions.

Electric motor systems consume large amounts of electrical energy and can provide an opportunity for significant energy savings. Energy represents more than 97 percent of total motor operating costs over the motor's lifetime. However, the purchase of a new motor often tends to be driven by the price, not the electricity it will consume. Even a small improvement in efficiency could result in significant energy and cost savings. Investing a little more money upfront for a more efficient motor is often paid back in energy savings. Improving energy efficiency reduces greenhouse gas emissions that contribute to climate change.

== Definition of motor efficiency ==
The efficiency of an electric motor is represented by the Greek letter Eta and defined as the ratio of output mechanical power to electric input power and can be calculated using this formula:

$\eta=\frac{Output Mechanical Power}{Input Electrical Power}$

Since the efficiency is a ratio, as long as the unit of measure is the same for both the output and input power, any unit of measure can be used for this calculation.

The shaft power is transferred to the machine driven; the electric input power is what is metered and charged for. Loss in motor efficiency is determined by the difference between the input power and output or shaft power.

^{P}_{loss} = ^{P}_{in} - ^{P}_{shaft}

^{P}_{loss} = losses of electric motor [kW]

Motor energy loss is mainly heat caused by many factors, including loss from the coil winding (resistance), loss in the rotor bars and slip rings, loss due to magnetising of the iron core, and loss from friction of bearings.

== Premium efficiency motor programs in USA ==
On December 19, 2007, President Bush signed the Energy Independence and Security Act of 2007 (EISA) into law (Public Law 140-110). The National Electrical Manufacturers Association (NEMA) actively participated in crafting major provisions on EISA. A critical provision that NEMA focused on was increased motor efficiency levels. The Motor Generator section of NEMA joined forces with the American Council for an Energy Efficient Economy to draft and recommend new motor efficiency regulations covering both general purpose and some categories of definite and special purpose electrical motors.

The Motor and Generator Section of NEMA established the NEMA Premium program for four main reasons:

- Electric motors have a significant impact on the total energy operating cost for industrial, institutional and commercial buildings.
- Electric motors vary in terms of energy efficiency. The NEMA Premium program will assist purchasers identify higher efficient motors that will save them money and improve system reliability.
- NEMA Premium labeled electric motors will assist users to optimize motor systems efficiency in light of power supply and utility deregulation issues.
- NEMA Premium motors and optimized systems will reduce electrical consumption thereby reducing pollution associated with electrical power generation.

Visit NEMA Premium Motors for more information.

A summary of EISA standards for motors:

== EU approach to premium efficiency motors ==
In June, 2005, the European Union enacted a Directive on establishing a framework for setting Eco-design requirements (such as energy efficiency requirements) for all energy using products in the residential, tertiary and industrial sectors. Coherent EU-wide rules for eco-design will ensure that disparities among national regulations do not become obstacles to intra-EU trade. The directive does not introduce directly binding requirements for specific products, but does define conditions and criteria for setting requirements regarding environmentally relevant product characteristics (such as energy consumption) and allows them to be improved quickly and efficiently. It will be followed by implementing measures which will establish the eco-design requirements. In principle, the Directive applies to all energy using products (except transport vehicles) and covers all energy sources.

== Unifying worldwide efficiency classifications ==
IEC 60034-30 specifies electrical efficiency classes for single-speed, three-phase, 50 Hz and 60 Hz, cage-induction motors that:

- have 2, 4, or 6 poles (3,000; 1,500; and 1,000 RPM at 50 Hz)
- have rated output between 0.75 and 375 kW
- have a rated voltage up to 1000 V
- are rated on the basis of either duty type S1 (continuous duty) or S3 (intermittent duty) with a rated cyclic duration factor of 80% or higher

The table below shows the IEC 60034-30 (2008) efficiency classes and comparable efficiency levels.

	Efficiency Levels	Comparison
IE1	Standard efficiency	
IE2	High efficiency	For 50 Hz considerably higher than EFF2 of CEMEP and identical to the U.S. EPAct for 60 Hz
IE3	Premium efficiency	New efficiency class in Europe for 50 Hz, higher than EFF1 on CEMEP and with some exceptions identical to NEMA Premium in the United States for 60 Hz.

The standard also reserves an IE4 class (Super Premium Efficiency) for the future. The following motors are excluded from the new efficiency standard:

- Motors made solely for inverter operation
- Motors completely integrated into a machine (pump, fan, or compressor) that cannot be tested separately from the machine.

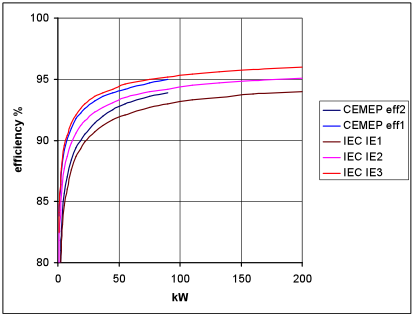
Graph is showing as example 50 Hz, 4-pole motors

For 60 Hz operation, the IE2 and IE3 minimum full-load efficiency values are virtually identical to the North American National Electrical Manufacturers Association (NEMA) Energy Efficient and Premium Efficiency motor standards, respectively. (NEMA does specify different full-load efficiency values for motors with Totally Enclosed Fan-Cooled and Open Drip-proof enclosures and from 200HP IEC IE3 efficiency is slightly higher than NEMA Premium Efficiency). The IEC minimum full-load efficiency standards are higher for 60 Hz motors than for 50 Hz motors. This is because as long as the motor torque is constant, I^{2}R or winding resistance losses are the same at 50 Hz and 60 Hz. The motor output power, however, increases linearly with speed, increasing by 20% when the frequency is increased from 50 Hz to 60 Hz. In general, the 60 Hz efficiency is about 2.5% to 0.5% greater than the 50 Hz values. The efficiency gain is greater for smaller motor power ratings.

To show compliance with these new efficiency standards, motors must be tested in accordance with the newly adopted IEC 60034-2–1 testing protocol. This procedure provides test results that are largely compatible with those obtained by the North American IEEE 112B and CSA 390 test methods. The new standard also requires that the motor efficiency class and nominal motor efficiency be labeled on the motor nameplate and given in product literature and motor catalogues in the following format:

IE3 94.5%

== New minimum energy performance standards in EU ==
On 22 July 2009, Commission Regulation (EC) No. 640/2009 implementing Directive 2005/32/EC states that in the EU, with the exception of some special applications, motors shall not be less efficient than the IE3 efficiency level as from 1 January 2015.

In detail:

- IE2 by June 16, 2011
- IE3 by January 1, 2015 (for motors from 7.5 to 375 kW) and IE2 only in combination with an adjustable-speed drive
- IE3 for all motors by January 1, 2017, (for motors from 0.75 to 375 kW) and IE2 only in combination with an adjustable speed drive

EC 60034–30, IE3 Premium Efficiency (%) is presented in the table.

IE3 Premium Efficiency

kW	2-pole		4-pole		6-pole	
kW	50 Hz	60 Hz	50 Hz	60 Hz	50 Hz	60 Hz
0.75	80.7	77.0	82.5	85.5	78.9	82.5
1.1	82.7	84.0	84.1	86.5	81.0	87.5
1.5	84.2	85.5	85.3	86.5	82.5	88.5
2.2	85.9	86.5	86.7	89.5	84.3	89.5
3	87.1	–	87.7	–	85.6	–
3.7	–	88.5	–	89.5	–	89.5
4	88.1	–	88.6	–	86.8	–
5.5	89.2	89.5	89.6	91.7	88.0	91.0
7.5	90.1	90.2	90.4	91.7	89.1	91.0
11	91.2	90.0	91.4	92.4	90.3	91.7
15	91.9	91.0	92.1	93.0	91.2	91.7
18.5	92.4	91.7	92.6	93.6	91.7	93.0
22	92.7	91.7	93.0	93.6	92.2	93.0
30	93.3	92.4	93.6	94.1	92.9	94.1
37	93.7	93.0	93.9	94.5	93.3	94.1
45	94.0	93.6	94.2	95.0	93.7	94.5
55	94.3	93.6	94.6	94.4	94.1	94.5
75	94.7	94.1	95.0	95.4	94.6	95.0
90	95.0	95.0	95.2	95.4	94.9	95.0
110	95.2	95.0	95.4	95.8	95.1	95.8
132	95.4	–	95.6	–	95.4	–
150	–	95.4	–	96.2	–	95.8
160	95.6	–	95.8	–	95.6	–
185	–	95.8	–	96.2	–	95.8
200	95.8	–	96.0	–	95.8	–
220	95.8	95.8	96.0	96.2	95.8	95.8
250	95.8	95.8	96.0	96.2	95.8	95.8
300	95.8	95.8	96.0	96.2	95.8	95.8
330	95.8	95.8	96.0	96.2	95.8	95.8
375	95.8	95.8	96.0	96.2	95.8	95.8

== Design of premium efficiency motors ==
Design of Premium Efficiency Motors needs special knowledge, experience and test facilities, equipped with precision instrumentation. The task of design is, to get the efficiency up by minimizing and balancing the single losses, especially those created in the stator coils, the stator iron (magnetizing) and the losses within the rotor by slip. In comparison to standard (e.g. IE1) electrical motors, more iron and copper material are used. IE3 motors are heavier and physically bigger than IE1 motors.

Typically use of higher slot fill in the copper winding, use of thinner laminations of improved steel properties, reducing the air gap, better design of cooling fan, use of special and improved bearings etc. can ensure higher efficiency in the motors.

The high electrical conductivity of copper versus other metallic conductors enhances the electrical energy efficiency of motors. Increasing the mass and cross section of conductors in a coil increases the electrical energy efficiency of the motor. Where energy savings are prime design objectives, induction motors can be designed to meet and exceed National Electrical Manufacturers Association (NEMA) premium efficiency standards.

== Commercial rebate programs ==
The U.S. Senate Energy and Natural Resources Committee adopted a NEMA-advocated provision that created a premium energy-efficient motor rebate program, also known as a "crush for credit" program, according to the National Electrical Manufacturers Association (NEMA). The program provided a $25 per horsepower rebate and a $5 per horsepower rebate for the disposal of the old motor. The latter program was needed to offset the cost difference between new, more expensive, efficient motors and the lesser cost to repair the older, more inefficient motors, NEMA says. This program allowed the federal government to spend $350 million in incentives for the widespread adoption of NEMA Premium motors.

The "Crush for Credit" provision contained in the Senate's version of the "Energy Policy and Conservation Act" (EPCA) ran for five years, and included the following proposed funding:

- $80,000,000 in FY2010
- $75,000,000 in FY2011
- $70,000,000 in FY2012
- $65,000,000 in FY2013
- $60,000,000 in FY2014

Within the EU, various Capital Allowance Schemes encourage companies to purchase equipment incorporating premium-efficiency motors. For example, in the UK, the Enhanced Capital Allowances Scheme provides a tax incentive to businesses that invest in equipment that meets published energy-saving criteria. The Energy Technology List (ETL) details the criteria for each type of technology, and lists those products in each category that meet them. It is managed by the Carbon Trust, on behalf of the Government, and has two parts:

- The Energy Technology Criteria List (ETCL), which is reviewed annually as part of to ensure that it reflects technological progress. It sets out the qualifying energy-saving criteria for each class of technology.
- The Energy Technology Product List (ETPL), updated at the start of each month on this website, lists the products and technologies that are eligible for an ECA.

The ETPL also contains details of the maximum claim values for qualifying products which comprise a component in a larger piece of plant and machinery, which does not itself qualify for ECAs.

Key Features of the ECA scheme are

- Open to all businesses that pay UK corporation or income tax, regardless of size, sector or location.
- Provides 100% first-year capital allowances on investments in energy-saving equipment against taxable profits of the period of investment.
- All the products listed on the ETPL must meet the energy-saving criteria, published in the ETCL.
- Only spending on new and unused energy-saving equipment can qualify for ECAs.
- Capital allowances are available for spending "on the provision of" plant and machinery. This can include certain costs arising as a direct result of the installation of qualifying plant and machinery such as; transport of the equipment to the site, and some direct installation costs. One can refer to the Claiming an ECA section for more information.

A similar scheme in Ireland, Accelerated Capital Allowance (ACA) run by Sustainable Energy Ireland (SEI) lets a company cut its taxable income by 100% of the capital cost of eligible energy-efficient equipment in the first year of purchase. This compares to just 12.5% for ineligible plant and machinery.

With the existing Capital Allowances tax structure, when money is spent on "capital equipment" companies can deduct the cost of this equipment from their profits proportionally over a period of 8 years, i.e. the annual taxable profit is only reduced by 1/8 of the total equipment cost.

With new ACA, when money is spent on "Eligible energy efficient capital equipment", the company can deduct the full cost of this equipment from their profits in the year of purchase, i.e. the taxable profit in year one is reduced by the full cost of the equipment.
