= Internal fan-cooled electric motor =

An internal fan-cooled electric motor (colloquially, fan-cooled motor) is a self cooling electric motor. Fan cooled motors feature an axial fan attached to the rotor of the motor (usually on the opposite end as the output shaft) that spins with the motor, providing increased airflow to the motor's internal and external parts which aids in cooling.

== Uses ==
Fan cooled motors have many common uses in motors that either produce a lot of heat or have poor airflow because they are always stationary or in an enclosed space and require a compact cooling system. They are common for industrial uses, household appliances such as blenders and mixers, power tools such as drills and rotary tools, and radio-controlled cars

== Advantages ==
Attaching an internal fan to a motor is a fairly simple way to cool it. Since a fan cooled motor always provides airflow over itself regardless of whether it is stationary or partially enclosed, it is more effective than using a heat sink in applications with poor airflow because heat sinks usually require air to be flowing over them for maximum effectiveness. Internal fan cooling also takes up far less space than external fan cooling or water cooling.

== Disadvantages ==
All fans generate noise, something that may not be desired in a motor, and drag on their power source. Also, like any device with a fan, increased airflow through the motor can cause increased dust build up, which could potentially hinder the motor's operation.
