= Blocked rotor test =

A blocked rotor test is conducted on an induction motor. It is also known as short-circuit test (because it is the mechanical analogy of a transformer short-circuit test), locked rotor test or stalled torque test. From this test, short-circuit current at normal voltage, power factor on short circuit, total leakage reactance, and starting torque of the motor can be found.

It is very important to know a motor's starting torque since if it is not enough to overcome the initial friction of its intended load then it will remain stationary while drawing an excessive current and rapidly overheat. The test may be conducted at lower voltage because at the normal voltage the current through the windings would be high enough to rapidly overheat and damage them. The test may still be conducted at full voltage if it is brief enough to avoid overheating the windings or overloading the starting circuits, but requires much more care to be taken while performing the test.

The blocked rotor torque test is less significant on wound-rotor motors because the starting torque of these wound-rotor motors depend upon the external resistance added. However, it may still be used to characterise the motor.

== Method ==
In the blocked rotor test, the rotor is locked securely enough that it cannot break free. A low voltage is applied on the stator terminals so that there is full load current in the stator winding, and the current, voltage and power input are measured at that point. When the rotor is stationary, the slip, $s = 1$.

The test is conducted at $1/4$ the rated frequency as recommended by IEEE, because the rotor's effective resistance at low frequency may differ at high frequency. The test can be repeated for different values of voltage to ensure the values obtained are consistent. As the current through the stator may exceed the rated current, the test should be conducted quickly.

By using the parameters found by this test, the motor circle diagram can be constructed.

== Calculations involved ==
=== Short-circuit current at normal voltage ===
$I_{S}$ is the short-circuit current at voltage $V_{S}$
$I_{SN}$ is the short-circuit current at normal voltage $V$
$I_{SN} = I_{S} \times \frac {V} {V_{S}}$

=== Short-circuit power factor ===
$W_{S}$ is the total input power on short circuit
$V_{SL}$ is the line voltage on short circuit
$I_{SL}$ is the line current on short circuit
$cos \phi_{S}$ is the short-circuit power factor
$cos \phi_{S} = \frac {W_{S}} {{\sqrt{3}} {V_{SL}} {I_{SL}}}$

=== Leakage reactance ===
$Z_{01}$ is the short-circuit impedance as referred to stator
$X_{01}$ is the leakage reactance per phase as referred to stator
$Z_{01} = \frac \text {short-circuit voltage per phase} \text {short-circuit current} = \frac {V_{S}} {I_{S}}$

$W_{cu}$ is the total copper loss
$W_{c}$ is the core loss

$W_{cu} = W_{S} - W_{c}$
$W_{cu} = {3} \times{{I_{S}}^{2} {R_{01}}}$

$R_{01} = \frac {W_{cu}} {3{I_{S}}^{2}}$

$X_{01} = \sqrt {{Z_{01}}^{2} - {R_{01}^{2}}}$

== See also ==
- Open-circuit test
- Circle diagram
