= Product literature =

Product literature is a primary subset of business publishing that is geared toward the selection, purchase and subsequent use of a business' products. Product literature is intended to be created and distributed by the manufacturer alongside the product. The two components are designed to work in tandem so as to provide more information to the purchaser regarding factors such as ongoing use, how the product functions and what the expected effects over time might be.

While the majority of product literature is put out by the business making the product, aftermarket material can still be classed as product literature provided that the content it contains pertains to the product. It is also possible for there to be no literature adjacent to the product. Some categories of product literature include product promotional literature, product datasheets, product development literature, product operating manuals and product purchasing terms and conditions.

== Promotional literature ==
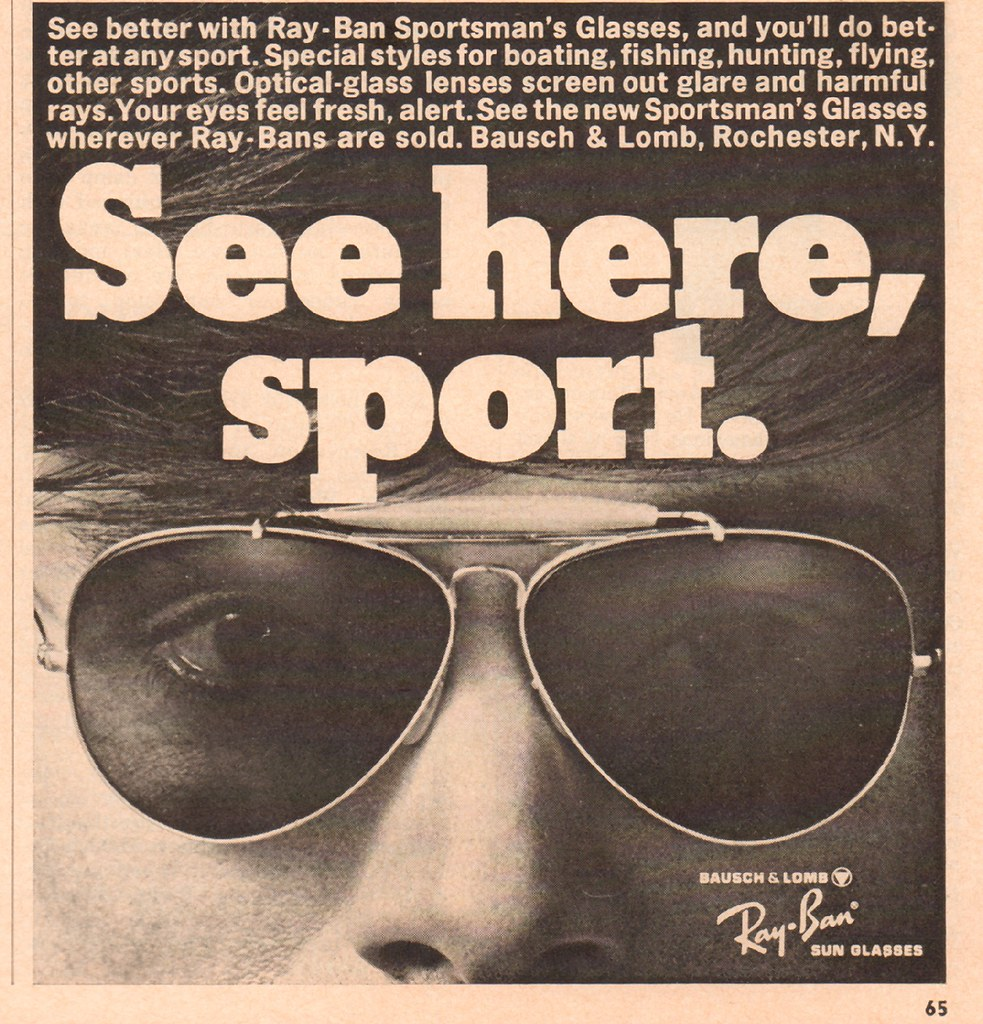
An advertisement for Ray-Ban sunglasses - an example of promotional literature

Promotional literature is a class of product literature that endorses and advocates for the selection and usage of a product. The primary function of promotional literature is to act as a form of advertising for the product that emphasises the benefits of choosing it. It also aims to mitigate the compromising effects that product uncertainty can have on a consumer. There does not necessarily have to be any differences between competing products, and often successful product differentiation will create an imagined perception of greater quality to become more popular in the market.

The price of a good can in of itself be a marketing tool. Consumers may view a product as of higher quality if the upfront cost surpasses that of its competition. Additionally, if the message of a product is transmitted in an expensive manner, such as through a multi-million dollar commercial with national exposure, the consumer may in turn place a greater degree of faith in the quality of the product. While promotional literature used for advertising is often an explicit endorsement of a specific product, it can alternately serve to build or affirm the reputation of the brand behind the product. This is most commonly done by brands who are seeking to uphold standards of quality or consumer expectation.

Promotional literature can be supplied directly to the consumer via systems such as print mail and electronic correspondence, or it can be indirectly supplied to the product's target audience as material that is associated with the acquisition of the product. There is continued debate as to which method of delivery is more effective at selling a product. It is also possible for promotional literature to be memorised and utilised by a salesperson of the product. Though in this case it is worth noting that the role of literature in this practice does not fit into the conventional understanding of written literature. Instead, the information becomes subject to the psychological pressures that come with selling person to person.

While the primary function of promotional literature is to make the product appeal to a consumer, it can also be used as a form of market research by the manufacturer. It can also be presented through permission based marketing as opposed to traditional methods of advertising. Additionally, there is no universally agreed format dictating how large or factually supported the promotional literature of a product should be. It is up to the manufacturer to determine what quantity and accuracy of material is appropriate to make available for the consumer.

== Product datasheets ==
Datasheet for a pressure sensor containing a product description and methods of usage

Product datasheets are a form of product literature used to provide quantitative information to the manufacturer or a consumer in relation to a product. A manufacturer may choose to implement datasheets during the development phase of a product as a means of smoothing production later. Datasheets can also be used throughout the creation of a product to track inventories, to model supply and demand and to calculate profit margins. In recent years each of these tasks have become more necessary for business' to ensure a high level of traceability in accordance with governmental regulations.

Online datasheets and specifications are seen on e-commerce platforms as a means to compensate for the lack of physical interaction that the consumer has with the product. They work alongside text and images to deliver the promotional literature in a more comprehensive manner that is necessary given the challenges that accompany online shopping.

Datasheets for consumers are usually not made for the same logistical purpose that the manufacturers’ are and are instead frequently provided as another form of promotional or instructional literature to go alongside the product. This is generally done by supplying certain figures considered to be of consumer interest, such as horsepower output for a car, pixel count for a digital camera, or battery life for rechargeable electronics. This is done to simplify the product for the consumer, so that they can make their purchasing decision based on a few key attributes that fulfil their situational needs. The supplied figures may also form part of a larger operating manual or other form of instructional literature. Additionally, datasheets may provide similar information aimed at consumers with various levels of technical knowledge, such as products that relate to medical purposes.

== Product development literature ==
Blueprints of the Shelby Cobra - An aftermarket interpretation of the car

Product development literature is a type of literature that is created and utilised during the constructing and designing of a product. This can begin when a product is in the stage of concept development. It is during this time that ideas regarding how the product will be configured and what life cycle it will have are decided upon by the manufacturer. The main focus of pre-development is to gather facts and to evaluate the potential success of the product before financially committing to the manufacturing process. Literature that arises during this time includes planning material like blueprints as well as other transcribed forms of prototyping. As the product is in a developmental phase at this point in time, the material will tend to be prospective and plan for the challenges of future selling. Depending on the company, records of the literature may be made public or kept private to avoid their product being plagiarised.

During and after the designing process of a product, various types of literature are used to refine the process of manufacturing, test the resulting product and to justify the market that the product will be entering into. They also inform workers involved in the manufacturing process with technical knowledge as to how the product must be constructed. These types of literature may include mediums such as datasheets, correspondence within the supply chain and demographic research. Eventually these practices lead to marketing material and promotional literature that has been informed by the research undertaken during the development of the product.

There is no guarantee that product development literature will be able to account for all factors affecting the marketplace and consumer habits. A product can be well supported by research and be presented in the right way given its target audience, however if it is not 'competitively right' than it may fail from a selling standpoint.

== Operating manuals ==
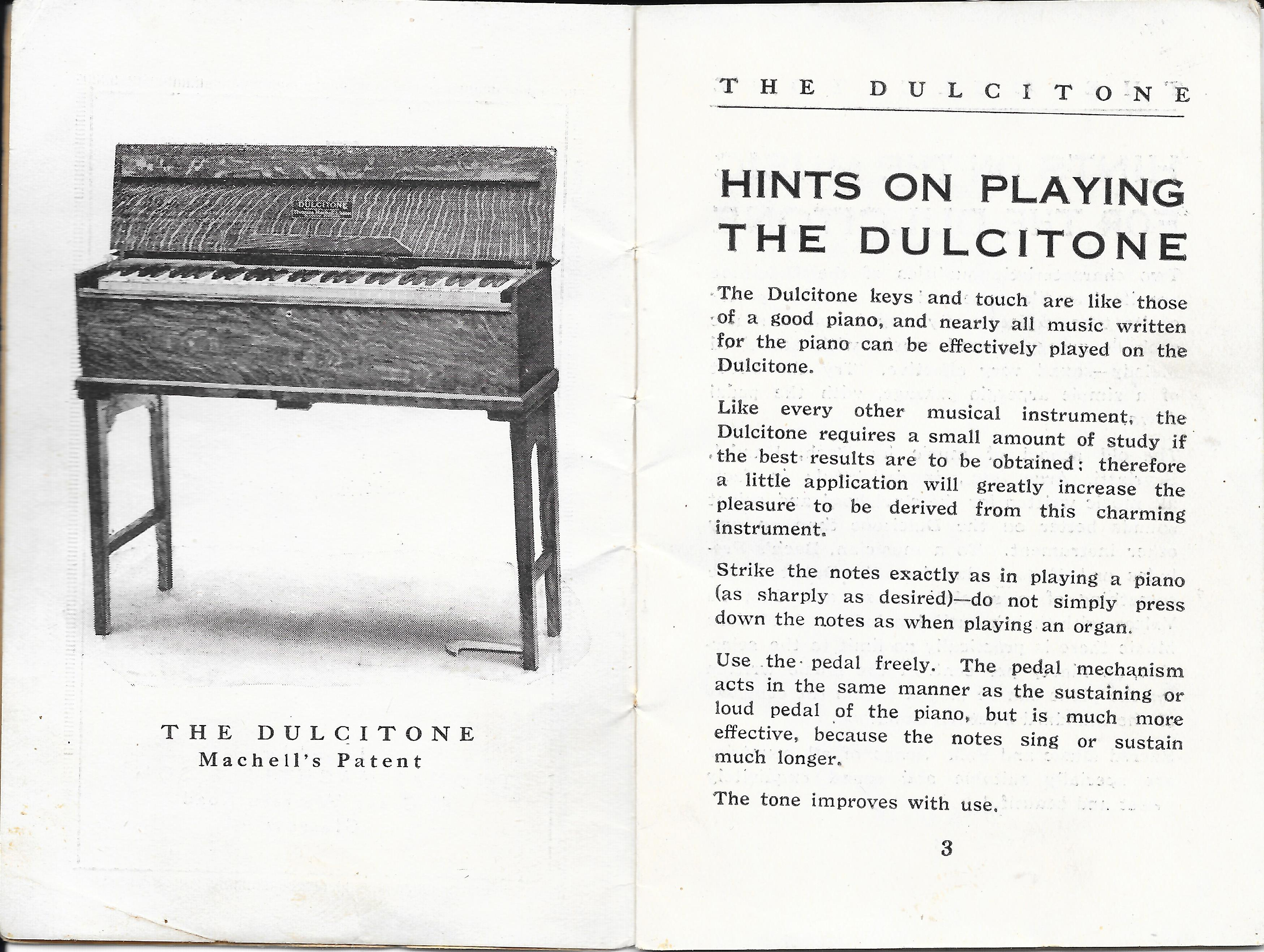
A user guide example of product literature that instructs on playing the Dulcitone

Operating manuals are a type of instructional literature designed to assist a consumer in using a product. The goal of operating manuals is to offer the consumer a series of replicable events that they should be able to follow to utilise the product in its intended form. They will typically contain a written and illustrated guide that outlines the product specifications, make and model number, methods of operation and general safety warnings. (Asset Insights, 2013).

The safety messages and warnings that operating manuals provide are intended to encourage cautious and informed behaviour for the consumer using the product. Operating manuals may also contain information regarding the product's warranty and the terms and conditions that the consumer agrees to upon purchasing the product.

== Purchase terms and conditions ==
Purchase terms and conditions are a form of contractual term entered into with the manufacturer of a product following the buyers’ purchasing of it. Not all products come with these purchasing requirements and the specific terms and conditions may vary depending on who the manufacturer is, what the product is and how much it costs. Generally, more expensive products that are complex in construction will come with a greater volume of terms and conditions. A consumer may also be reassured by the presence of terms and conditions as they can signal that the product is more valid and trustworthy.

Terms and conditions of usage tend to be issued in one instance upon the purchase of a product. For a product requiring purchasing in multiple instalments such as an online streaming service, the purchasing terms and conditions are designed to endure over each subsequent renewal of the service that the consumer makes. If the service is not renewed, the terms and conditions are no longer applicable. In the case of a service like this, the subscription itself is the product to which the terms and conditions apply. The content that the subscription provides access to is a separate product within the confines of the service, and as such will likely have its own terms of use.

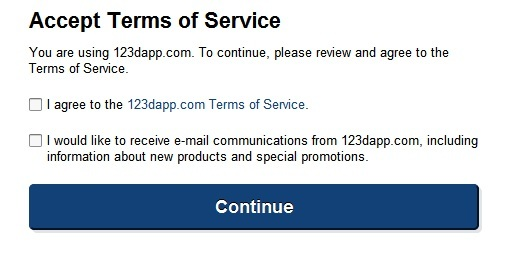
A prompt to accept the terms and conditions of a website

Online terms and conditions have also been seen in greater frequency with the recent rise in popularity of the internet. Websites can prompt the user with a message asking them to accept terms of service, following which they are expected to accept to continue using the site. There is contention as to whether the terms of website usage are easily enforceable, though the provider of the site still retains the right to take their own action or withhold the service from the consumer.

Depending on the country in which the product was purchased, different consumer protection policies will protect the buyer against fraudulent or faulty goods. These can be independently enforced by an organisation, regulated by the government of the country, or by a combination of both. These can supersede the purchasing conditions that the manufacturer sets, provided that it was not the consumer that violated the requirements of the marketplace.

== Miscellaneous ==
Other forms of product literature not extensively discussed may include, but are not limited to:

- Personalised epistolary inclusions such as a Thank you note or other general descriptions of the product. Can be handwritten or typed depending on the business
- Receipts or other proof of purchase documents
- Product reviews, either from third party sources, second party sources or as manufacturer sponsored content
- Product warranty's or other forms of consumer guarantees
- Price tags or other forms of stickers and labels that indicate cost
- Promotional codes, coupons or discounts that allow for making subsequent purchases from the same retailer
- Websites and online descriptions
- Online discussion forums
