= Short-circuit test =

Electrical test

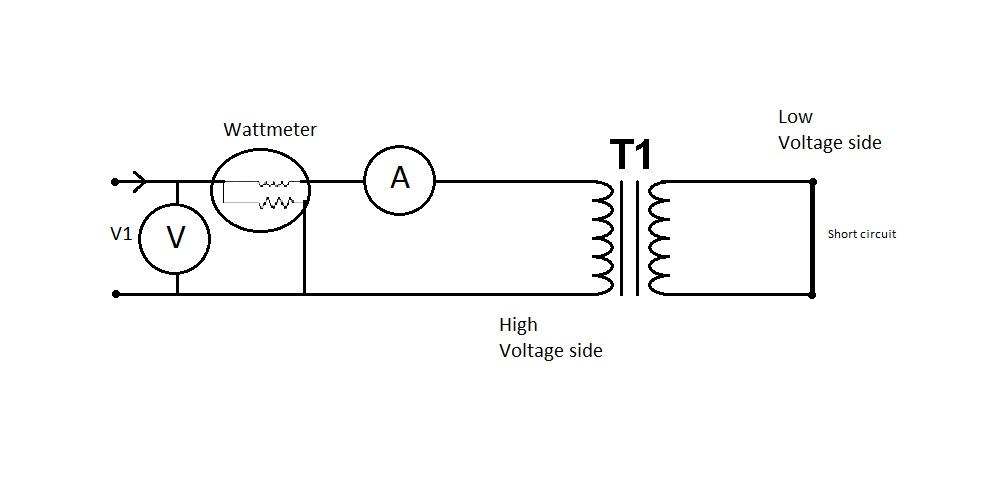
Circuit diagram for short-circuit test

The purpose of a short-circuit test is to determine the series branch parameters of the equivalent circuit of a transformer.

== Method ==
The test is conducted on the high-voltage (HV) side of the transformer where the low-voltage (LV) side (or the secondary) is short-circuited. A wattmeter is connected to the primary side. An ammeter is connected in series with the primary winding. A voltmeter is optional since the applied voltage is the same as the voltmeter reading. Now with the help of a variac, the applied voltage is slowly increased until the ammeter gives a reading equal to the rated current of the HV side. After reaching the rated current of the HV side, all three instruments' readings (voltmeter, ammeter, and wattmeter readings) are recorded. The ammeter reading gives the primary equivalent of the full load current I_{L}. As the voltage applied for full load current in a short circuit test on the transformer is quite small compared to the rated primary voltage of the transformer, the iron losses in the transformer can be taken as negligible here.

== Calculations ==
$W$ is the full-load copper loss

$V_1$ is the applied voltage

$I_1$ is the rated current

$R_{01}$ is the resistance as viewed from the primary

${Z_{01}}$ is the total impedance as viewed from the primary

${X_{01}}$ is the reactance as viewed from the primary

${W} = {{I_1}^2}{R_{01}}$

${R_{01}} = \frac{{W}}{{I_1}^2}$

${Z_{01}} = \frac{{V_1}}{{I_1}}$

${X_{01}} = \sqrt{{Z_{01}}^2 -{R_{01}}^2}$

== High-power tests ==
A short-circuit test for determination of transformer impedance and losses is carried out with relatively low power applied to the transformer and with winding currents of the same magnitude as in operation. A different form of short-circuit testing is done to assess the mechanical strength of the transformer windings, and their ability to withstand the high forces produced if an energized transformer experiences a short-circuit fault. Currents during such events can be several times the normal rated current. The resultant forces can distort the windings or break internal connections. For large utility-scale power transformers, high-power test laboratories have facilities to apply the very high-power levels representative of a fault on an interconnected grid system.

== See also ==
- Open-circuit test
- Blocked rotor test
- Circle diagram
