= Circle diagram =

Graphical representation of the performance of an electrical machine

The circle diagram (also known as a Heyland, Ossanna, or Sumec diagram or ... circle) is the graphical representation of the performance of an electrical machine in terms of the locus of the machine's input voltage and current. It was first conceived by Alexander Heyland in 1894 and Bernhard Arthur Behrend in 1895, and subsequently improved by Johann Ossanna in 1899 and Josef Sumec in 1910.

In particular, Sumec's contribution was to incorporate the rotor resistance.

The Heyland diagram is an approximate representation of a circle diagram applied to induction motors, which assumes that stator input voltage, rotor resistance and rotor reactance are constant and stator resistance and core loss are zero.

The theory of the Heyland diagram begins with Steinmetz's analysis of an induction motor as a real transformer attached to a varying resistance:

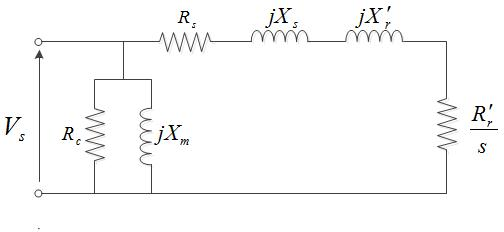
Steinmetz equivalent circuit for an induction motor

As the motor speed varies, so does the resistance, as does the current through the motor. The circle diagram obtains its name because the real and imaginary parts of the current phasor from a circle in the complex plane.

Further information can be obtained through additional geometric constructions on the same plot. The appropriate scale identifies current with power, multiplying the current by the phase voltage and the number of phases.

A complete diagram, with all possible information marked, is:

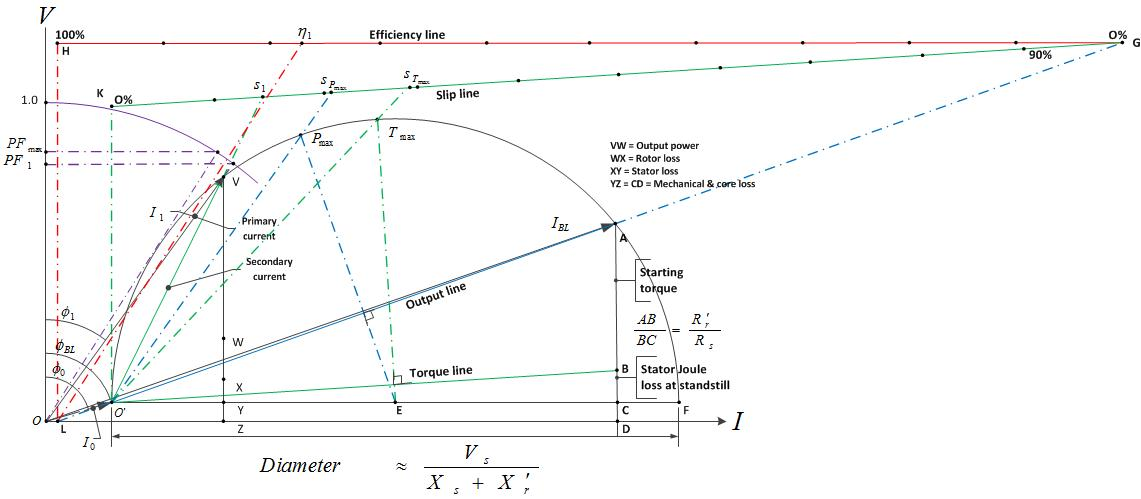
Constant air-gap induction motor circle diagram

where

- R_{s}, X_{s}: Stator resistance and leakage reactance
- R_{r}′, X_{r}′, ..._{s}: Rotor resistance and leakage reactance referred to the stator and rotor slip
- R_{c}, X_{m}, : Core and mechanical losses, magnetization reactance
- V_{s}, Impressed stator voltage
- I_{0} = OO′, I_{BL} = OA, I_{1} =OV: No load current, blocked rotor current, operating current
- Φ_{0}, Φ_{BL} : No load angle, blocked rotor angle
- P_{max}, s_{Pmax}, PF_{max}, T_{max}, s_{Tmax}: Maximum output power & related slip, maximum power factor, maximum torque & related slip
- η_{1}, s_{1}, PF_{1}, Φ_{1},: Efficiency, slip, power factor, PF angle at operating current
- AB: Represents rotor power input, which divided by synchronous speed equals starting torque.

In practice, the circle diagram is drawn from the data obtained from no load and either short-circuit or, in case of machines, blocked rotor tests by fitting a half-circle in points O^{'} and A.

Beyond the error inherent in the constant air-gap assumption, the circle diagram introduces errors due to rotor reactance and rotor resistance variations caused by magnetic saturation and rotor frequency over the range from no-load to operating speed.

== See also ==
- Steinmetz equivalent circuit
