= TEFC motor =

Motor in an enclosure shielding it from outside air

A totally enclosed fan-cooled motor (TEFC motor) is a type of industrial electric motor with an enclosure that does not permit outside air to freely circulate through the interior of the motor. An external fan blows outside air over the frame of the motor to cool it. This motor is arguably the most commonly used motor in ordinary industrial environments. TEFC enclosed motors usually cost more than open motors, but offer increased protection against weather, dirt, and moisture.

The weight-to-power ratio of the TEFC motor is higher than the one exhibited by the designs where the external air is allowed access to internal parts. This ratio did not improve with time and new materials either, so TEFC motors are preferred for ratings up to 500 hp (375 kW) and available with ratings up to 1000 hp (750 kW).

TEFC motors are constructed with a small fan on the rear shaft of the motor, covered by a housing. This fan forces air over the motor frame fins, and cools the motor. The enclosure is "Totally Enclosed". This means that the motor is dust tight, and has a moderate water seal as well. With typical IP ratings of 44/54, TEFC motors are not secure against high pressure water nor submersible. They are also not explosion proof without additional modifications.

TEFC motors can be compared to the ODP (Open Drip Proof, also DPG, Drip Proof Guarded) motor design, which has ventilation openings which are guarded to prevent falling water from entering the motor windings. The ODP motors are less environmentally protected (IP 22).

For the cases where the cooling performance of TEFC motor is not sufficient, modification with heat exchangers are available, with the motor still totally enclosed:

- Totally enclosed air-to-air cooled (TEAAC): the motor is cooled by the circulating internal air passing through a heat exchanger, which in turn is cooled by the external air;
- Totally enclosed water-air cooled (TEWAC): the motor is used when the cooling water is available and includes a air-to-water heat exchanger.

== Applications and types ==
- "General Purpose" Fractional Horse Power Motors - Often made of rolled steel, these are multi-purpose motors suitable for a diverse range of industrial applications, and are usually offered in power ranges from 0.33–2 horsepower (0.25–1.49 kW).
- Farm Duty Motors – These high torque and robustly designed motors are a good choice for many farm applications, being totally enclosed and protected from the environment.
- "Wash Down" Motors – These motors are designed to withstand regular washing, such as found in a food processing facility.
- Rock Crusher Motors – These motors are an excellent choice for hammermills, pellet mills, and chippers for the biomass industry.
- Oil Well Pump Motors –
- Severe Duty Motors –
- Pool Pump Motors – One of the quietest motor pump on the market, due to its permanent magnet motor and TEFC design

== Sources ==
- Khan, Shoaib; Khan, Sheeba; Ahmed, Ghariani (2018-10-03). "9.3.10 Enclosures". Industrial Power Systems. CRC Press. pp. 204–205. ISBN 978-1-4200-1539-3.
- Parasiliti, Francesco; Bertoldi, Paolo (2012-12-06). Energy Efficiency in Motor Driven Systems. Springer Science & Business Media. ISBN 978-3-642-55475-9.
