= Dimitri Rozhdestvensky =

Russian physicist

- Дмитрий Рождественский
- Born: 7 April 1876; St. Petersburg, Russian Empire
- Died: June 25, 1940 (aged 64); Leningrad, Russian SFSR, Soviet Union
- Education: Saint Petersburg State University
- Scientific career
- Fields: Physics
- Workplaces: Saint Petersburg State University; State Optical Institute

Dimitri Sergeevich Rozhdestvensky (Russian: Дми́трий Серге́евич Рожде́ственский, 7 April 1876 – 25 June 1940) was a Russian physicist. He worked on spectroscopy, examining the dispersion of sodium lines. He drew up a proposal for the State Optical Institute which was established in 1918 in Petrograd.

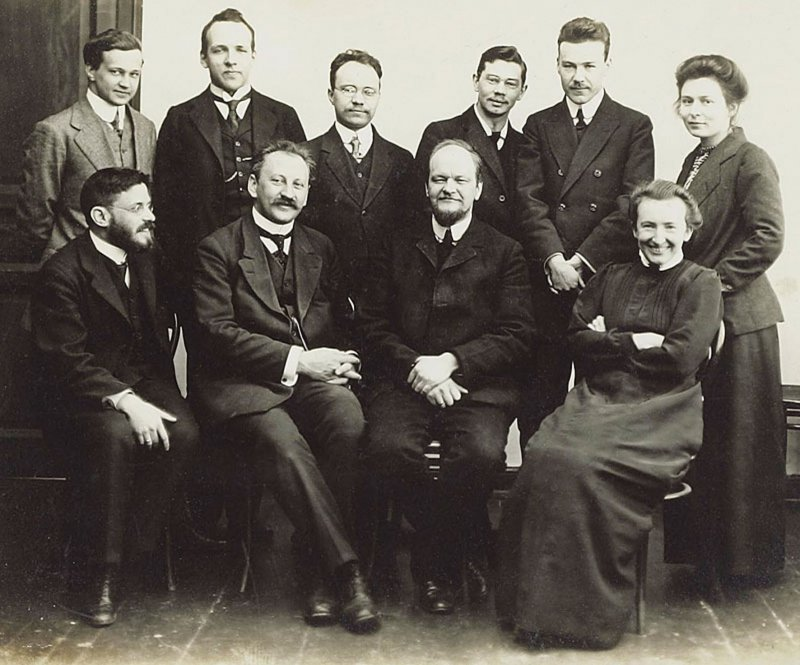
Group photograph of the St Petersburg physics circle. Seated l-r: Paul Ehrenfest, Abram Ioffe, Dimitri Roschdestwenski, Tatyana Ehrenfest-Afanassjewa, standing l-r: Wladimir Michailowitsch Tschulanowski; Georgi Georgijewitsch Weichardt; Leonid Dmitrijewitsch Issakow; Perlitz; Victor Bursian and Jadwiga Szmidt.

== Education ==
Rozhdestvensky graduated in 1894 and went to study at St. Petersburg.

== Career ==
He worked in Giessen with Paul Drude from 1901 to 1903 before returning to St. Petersburg. He was involved in establishing optics research. During this time, he was part of a group of physicists known at the St Petersburg physics circle, who organised regular meetings. Among them were Paul Ehrenfest, Abram Ioffe, Tatyana Ehrenfest-Afanassjewa and Jadwiga Szmidt.

He received a Mendeleev Medal in 1912. He became a professor of physics in 1916. He developed theories to explain atomic spectra. He is buried in the Literatorskie mostki (writers' footways) section of the Volkovo Cemetery in St. Petersburg.
