= Tatyana van Aardenne-Ehrenfest =

Dutch mathematician (1905–1984)

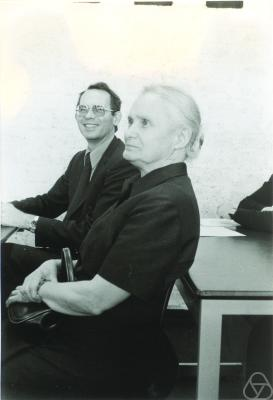
- Van Aardenne-Ehrenfest in 1977; Photo courtesy of MFO
- Born: Tatyana Pavlovna Ehrenfest; October 28, 1905; Vienna, Austria
- Died: November 29, 1984 (aged 79); Dordrecht, Netherlands
- Education: University of Leiden
- Known for: De Bruijn sequence BEST theorem
- Parent(s): Paul Ehrenfest; Tatyana Afanasyeva
- Relatives: Galinka Ehrenfest (sister)
- Scientific career
- Fields: Mathematics
- Thesis: Oppervlakken met scharen van gesloten geodetische lijnen (1931)
- Doctoral advisor: Willem van der Woude

Tatyana Pavlovna van Aardenne-Ehrenfest (née Ehrenfest; October 28, 1905 – November 29, 1984) was a Dutch mathematician. She is known for her contributions to De Bruijn sequences, low-discrepancy sequences, and the BEST theorem.

== Early life and education ==
Tatyana Ehrenfest was born in Vienna in 1905 and spent her childhood in St Petersburg. She is the daughter of physicists Paul Ehrenfest and Tatyana Afanasyeva.

In 1912 the Ehrenfests moved to Leiden where her father succeeded Hendrik Lorentz as professor at the University of Leiden. Until 1917 she was home schooled; after that, she attended the Gymnasium in Leiden and passed the final exams in 1922. She studied mathematics and physics at the University of Leiden. In 1928 she went to Göttingen where she took courses from Harald Bohr and Max Born. On December 8, 1931, she obtained her Ph.D. in Leiden, advised by Willem van der Woude. After that, she was never employed and, in particular, never held any academic position.

== Contributions ==
De Bruijn sequences are cyclic sequences of symbols for a given alphabet and parameter $k$ such that every length-$k$ subsequence occurs exactly once within them. They are named after Nicolaas Govert de Bruijn, despite their earlier discovery (for binary alphabets) by Camille Flye Sainte-Marie. De Bruijn and Van Aardenne-Ehrenfest jointly published the first investigation into de Bruijn sequences for larger alphabets, in 1951.

The BEST theorem, also known as the de Bruijn–van Aardenne-Ehrenfest–Smith–Tutte theorem, relates Euler tours and spanning trees in directed graphs, and gives a product formula for their number. It is a variant of an earlier formula of Cedric Smith and W. T. Tutte, and was published by de Bruijn and Ehrenfest in the same paper as their work on de Bruijn sequences.

Van Aardenne-Ehrenfest is also known for her proof of a lower bound on low-discrepancy sequences.
