= De Bruijn torus =

Array containing every possible matrix of size m × n

STL model of de Bruijn torus (16,32;3,3)_{2} with 1s as panels and 0s as holes in the mesh – with consistent orientation, every 3×3 matrix appears exactly once (external viewer)

In combinatorial mathematics, a De Bruijn torus, named after Dutch mathematician Nicolaas Govert de Bruijn, is an array of symbols from an alphabet (often just 0 and 1) that contains every possible matrix of given dimensions m × n exactly once. It is a torus because the edges are considered wraparound for the purpose of finding matrices. Its name comes from the De Bruijn sequence, which can be considered a special case where n = 1 (one dimension).

One of the main open questions regarding De Bruijn tori is whether a De Bruijn torus for a particular alphabet size can be constructed for a given m and n. It is known that these always exist when n = 1, since then we simply get the De Bruijn sequences, which always exist. It is also known that "square" tori exist whenever m = n and even (for the odd case the resulting tori cannot be square).

The smallest possible binary "square" de Bruijn torus, depicted above right, denoted as (4,4;2,2)_{2} de Bruijn torus (or simply as B_{2}), contains all 2×2 binary matrices.

== B_{2} ==
The (4,4;2,2) de Bruijn torus. Each 2-by-2 binary matrix can be found within it exactly once.

Apart from "translation", "inversion" (exchanging 0s and 1s) and "rotation" (by 90 degrees), no other (4,4;2,2)_{2} de Bruijn tori are possible – this can be shown by complete inspection of all 2^{16} binary matrices (or subset fulfilling constrains such as equal numbers of 0s and 1s).

De Bruijn torus (8,8;3,2) containing all 64 possible 3-row × 2-column matrices exactly once, with wraparound – the bottom half is the negative of the top half

The torus can be unrolled by repeating n−1 rows and columns. All n×n submatrices without wraparound, such as the one shaded yellow, then form the complete set:

1	0	1	1	1
1	0	0	0	1
0	0	0	1	0
1	1	0	1	1
1	0	1	1	1

== Larger example: B_{4} ==
B_{4} as a binary square matrix The grid highlights some of the 4×4 matrices, including those of zeros and of ones at the upper margin.

An example of the next possible binary "square" de Bruijn torus, (256,256;4,4)_{2} (abbreviated as B_{4}), has been explicitly constructed.

The image on the right shows an example of a (256,256;4,4)_{2} de Bruijn torus / array, where the zeros have been encoded as white and the ones as red pixels respectively.

== Binary de Bruijn tori of greater size ==
The paper in which an example of the (256,256;4,4)_{2} de Bruijn torus was constructed contained over 10 pages of binary, despite its reduced font size, requiring three lines per row of array.

The subsequent possible binary de Bruijn torus, containing all binary 6×6 matrices, would have 2^{36} = 68,719,476,736 entries, yielding a square array of dimension 262,144×262,144, denoted a (262144,262144;6,6)_{2} de Bruijn torus or simply B_{6}. This could easily be stored on a computer—if printed with pixels of side 0.1 mm, such a matrix would require an area of approximately 26×26 square metres.

The object B_{8}, containing all binary 8×8 matrices and denoted (4294967296,4294967296;8,8)_{2}, has a total of 2^{64} ≈ 18.447×10^{18} entries: storing such a matrix would require 18.5 exabits, or 2.3 exabytes of storage. At the above scale, it would cover 429×429 square kilometres.

The following table illustrates the super-exponential growth.

n	Cells in a submatrix = n^{2}	Number of submatrices = 2^{n^{2}}	B_{n} side length = 2^{(n^{2}/2)}
2	4	16	4
4	16	65 536	256
6	36	68 719 476 736	262 144
8	64	~1.84×10^{19}	~4.29×10^{9}
10	100	~1.27×10^{30}	~1.13×10^{15}
12	144	~2.23×10^{43}	~4.72×10^{21}
14	196	~1.00×10^{59}	~3.17×10^{29}
16	256	~1.16×10^{77}	~3.40×10^{38}
18	324	~3.42×10^{97}	~5.85×10^{48}
20	400	~2.60×10^{120}	~1.61×10^{60}

== Applications ==
Simplified principle of the Anoto digital pen. The camera identifies a 6×6 matrix of dots, each displaced from the blue grid (not printed) in one of 4 directions. The combinations of relative displacements of a 6-bit de Bruijn sequence between the columns, and between the rows gives its absolute position on the digital paper.

De Bruijn tori are used in the spatial coding context, e.g. for localization of a camera, a robot or a tangible based on some optical ground pattern.

They are also used as basis of the PuzzleBoard, an optical camera calibration target which adds position encoding to a chessboard calibration pattern.

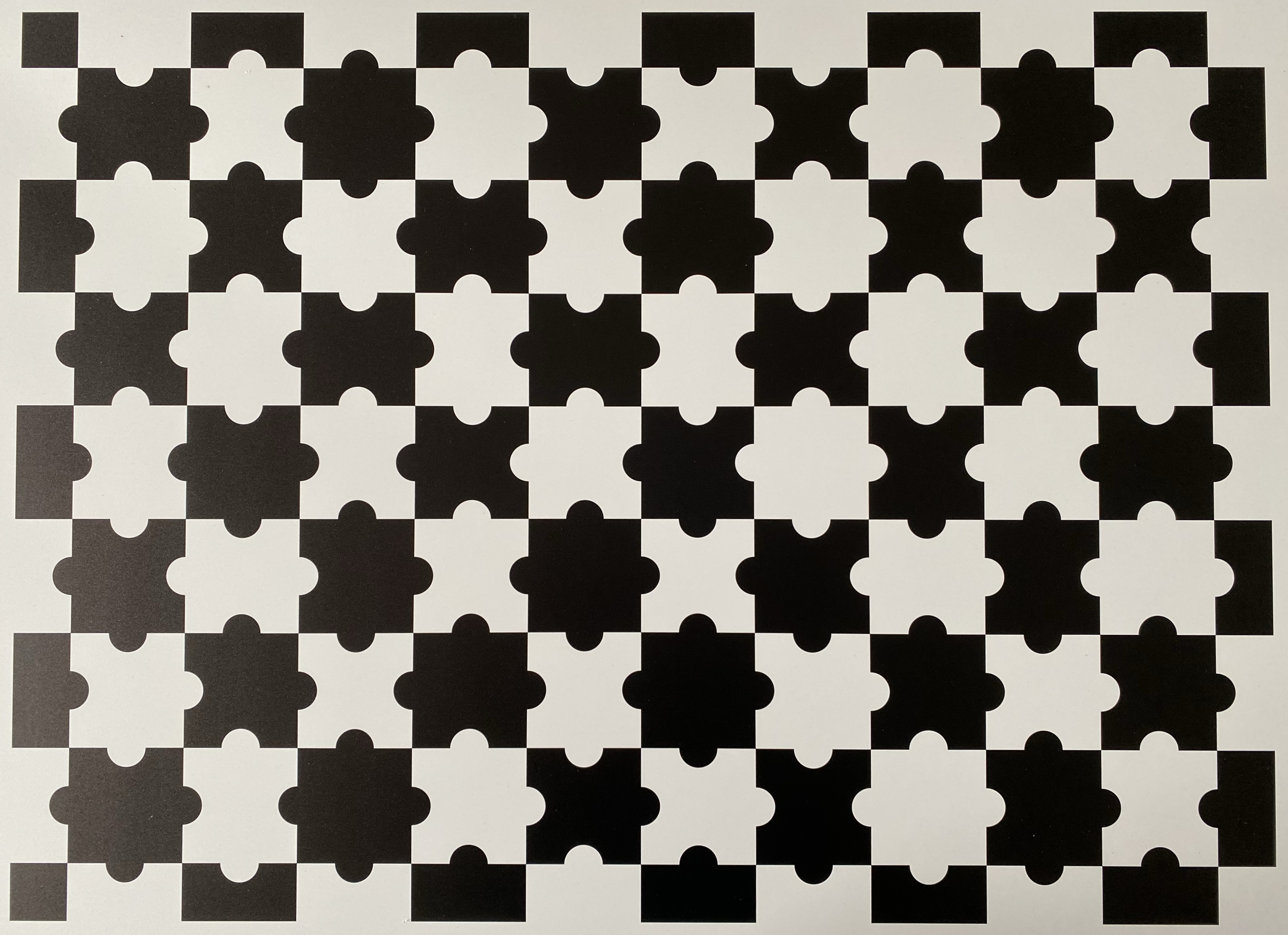
An example of a PuzzleBoard pattern with 8x11 chessboard corners. Each 3x3 tile pattern is unique.

De Bruijn tori can be used to implement digital paper, similar to the Anoto system. Each Anoto cell has four possible states and is thus based on a de Bruijn torus like structure with alphabet size 4. It uses a repeating 6-bit De Bruijn sequence with different offsets as columns.

== See also ==
- Digital paper
- De Bruijn sequence
- De Bruijn graph
- Chessboard detection
