= Victor Bursian =

Russian and Soviet scientist (1886–1945)

- Victor Robertovich Bursian
- Born: Victor Robertovich Bursian; 25 December 1886; Saint Petersburg, Russia
- Died: 15 December 1945 (aged 58); Leningrad, Soviet Union
- Education: Saint Petersburg Imperial University
- Scientific career
- Fields: Theoretical physics; geophysics
- Workplaces: Polytechnic Institute of Petrograd; Ioffe Institute; Vavilov State Optical Institute; Saint Petersburg Imperial University

Victor Robertovich Bursian (Russian: Виктор Робертович Бурсиан; 25 December 1886 – 15 December 1945) was a Russian and Soviet scientist who worked on theoretical physics, geophysics, electricity and thermodynamics, crystal physics, and the theory of electrical resistivity tomography.

== Early life ==
Victor Robertovich Bursian was born to a prominent physician, a specialist in massage and physical therapy. His father died during the siege of Leningrad in 1942.

== Academic career ==
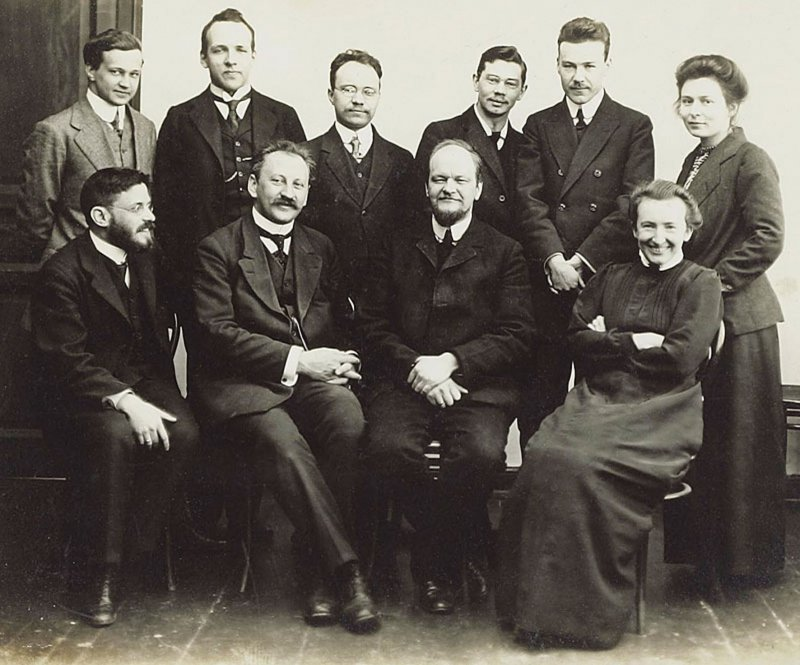
(from left to right): Paul Ehrenfest, Abram Ioffe, Dmitry Rozhdestvensky, Tatyana Afanasyeva. Standing (from left to right): Vladimir Chulanovsky, G. Weichardt, L. Isakov, G. Perlitz, Victor Robertovich Bursian, Jadwiga Szmidt

In 1904, he entered the Physics and Mathematics Faculty of Saint Petersburg Imperial University. In 1906, at the invitation of the German physicist Friedrich Paschen, he studied at the University of Tübingen in Germany for two semesters. After graduating from Saint Petersburg University in 1910, he taught from 1918 and lectured at the Polytechnic Institute of Petrograd. He was the first scientific secretary and first head of the theoretical department of the Physicotechnical Institute founded by Abram Ioffe . from 1920 he was a Member of the Atomic Commission at the State Optical Institute, chaired by D. S. Rozhdestvensky.

From 1932, he worked as a professor and head of the department at Leningrad University. In 1933, he was appointed dean of the Faculty of Physics, and from 1934, director of the Research Physics Institute (NIFI).

In the 1930s, he worked at the geological committee of the Central Institute of the Geological Prospecting Research (TsNIGRI).

== Contribution to geophysics ==
Bursian's contribution to geophysics is unexplored; however, the role of him in developing electromagnetic method such as the Sundberg method must not be disregarded. He treated a buried cable and a cable on the ground surface. He also outlined a complete solution to the problem of a long cable on a multilayered earth. Bursian had remarkable work on covering dipole sources.

At Leningrad State University's Department of Electrical Exploration, he developed the theoretical foundations of mineral exploration, and managed to discover large copper-pyrite deposits in the Ural region using the method of equipotential lines. He took part in expeditions to the regions of the Urals, West Siberian Lowland, Kuzbass, Kuznetsk Alatau, and the Caspian Lowland. He even personally led some of them. His role in the organization of higher geophysical education and the training of young specialists in universities is great. With his active participation, profiles were determined and the first plans of geophysical specialties were developed.

== Arrest and death ==
On 8 October 1936, Bursian was arrested in connection with the Pulkovo case. In May 1937, at the Military Collegium of the USSR Supreme Court, he was sentenced to 10 years in prison. He was sent to work at the Special Technical Bureau of the NKVD ("Kresty"), where he was engaged in the thermal calculation of tools. With the beginning of the Great Patriotic War together in the OKB evacuation to the city of Molotov.

In May 1945, he returned to Leningrad. He died on 15 December of the same year in a prison hospital from a kidney disease.

He was posthumously rehabilitated in 1956.

== Research interests ==
Bursian was one of the pioneers of Soviet physics who played a large role in the development of theoretical physics in the USSR. Bursian carried out studies on the physics of currents in gases and vacuum, on dispersion and gyration, the electronic theory of matter and the kinetics of chain reactions. He was the first to develop electrophysical methods in geological exploration.

Bursian is the author of a number of scientific works on theoretical physics. The most famous are his work on thermionic emission and the passage of current through a vacuum.

== Selected works ==
- V.R. Bursian, Theory of electromagnetic fields used in electrical exploration, Leningrad: Nedra, 1933 (in Russian).
