= Jadwiga Szmidt =

Polish-Russian physicist (1889–1940)

- Jadwiga Szmidt in 1912
- Born: 8 September 1889; Łódź, Congress Poland
- Died: April 1940 (age 51); Leningrad, Soviet Union
- Scientific career
- Fields: Radiology; Radioactivity; Engineering

Jadwiga Ryszardowna Szmidt (Russian: Ядвига Ричардовна Шмидт-Чернышева, romanized: Yadviga Richardovna Shmidt-Chernysheva; 8 September 1889 – April 1940) was a Polish-Russian physicist. She conducted pioneering research in the fields of optical engineering, radiology, radioactivity and electrical engineering. While a student, she spent short spells in the laboratories of Marie Curie in Paris and Ernest Rutherford in Manchester. After helping World War I refugees in Saint Petersburg, she joined the Saint Petersburg Polytechnic Institute where she headed the electronics laboratory from 1924.

== Early life and education ==
Jadwiga Ryszardowna Szmidt was born in Łódź on 8 September 1889, the daughter of Ryszard Szmidt. At the time of her birth, the city was under the control of the Russian Empire, but her family were of Polish descent. They were also Protestants. She undertook her early education in Warsaw, and between 1905 and 1909 studied at the Women's Pedagogical Institute in St Petersburg, a teacher-training college now part of Herzen University.

== Career ==
=== Activities as a student ===
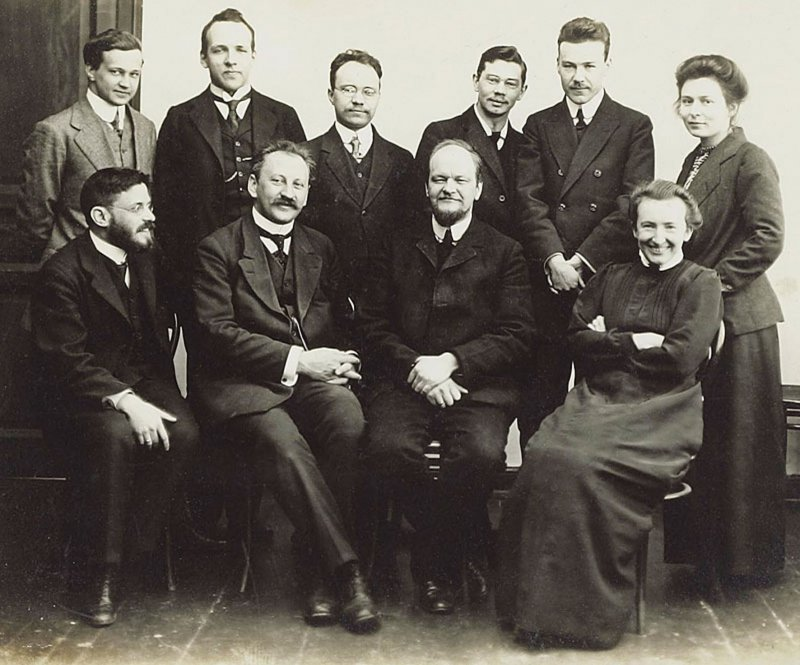
Group photograph of the St Petersburg physics circle. Seated l-r: Paul Ehrenfest, Abram Ioffe, Dimitri Roschdestwenski, Tatyana Ehrenfest-Afanassjewa, standing l-r: Wladimir Michailowitsch Tschulanowski; Georgi Georgijewitsch Weichardt; Leonid Dmitrijewitsch Issakow; Perlitz; Victor Bursian and Jadwiga Szmidt.

After graduating, Szmidt worked as a physics teacher at the Tagantsev Girls' Gymnasium, a school for upper class girls in Saint Petersburg. She ran laboratory sessions as well as theoretical lessons for her pupils. During this time, Szmidt was part of a group of physicists who regularly organised meetings. Among them were Paul Ehrenfest, Abram Ioffe, Dimitri Rozhdestvensky and Tatyana Ehrenfest-Afanassjewa. She also attended lectures on optics given by Russian physicist and engineer Alexander Lvovich Gershun, and began research into optoelectronics in his laboratory.

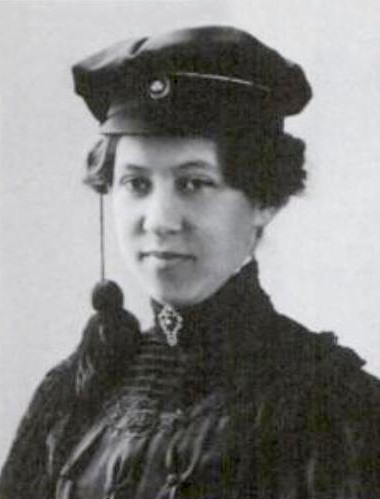
Ellen Gleditsch

In 1911, Szmidt left for a six-month training course at the Sorbonne in Paris. Thanks to the intercession of the physicist Jan Kazimierz Danysz (she held a teaching diploma rather than a bachelor's degree), Szmidt was able to take up a position in Marie Skłodowska-Curie's laboratory during her time in Paris. She collaborated with the Norwegian physicist Ellen Gleditsch, the British chemist May Sybil Leslie and Swedish physicist Eva Ramstedt during her time there. She remained friends with Leslie and Gleditsch for many years.

On her return to Saint Petersburg, Szmidt initially resumed her role as a teacher. From 1913 to 1914, she studied at the University of Manchester and worked in Ernest Rutherford's laboratory. She published two papers in the Philosophical Magazine on the basis of radioactivity research she conducted under Rutherford. Her research included the energy relationship between soft and hard gamma radiation emitted by radium decay products. Whilst working alone in the laboratory in Manchester, she suffered severe poisoning when she opened a container believed to contain either sulphur dioxide or carbon dioxide. Sources differ on the nature of the container and the chemical it contained, but it was considered lucky that she survived and did not die from the chemical exposure.

Szmidt confided in Gleditsch when she visited that she did not feel that she could settle in Britain, but found her time there doing research to be very valuable. Leslie, then working in Liverpool, also visited her in Manchester. She later wrote to Rutherford, "I have just seen the August [issue of] Phil.[osophical] Mag.[azine], where my paper was published. […] That paper was not worth it, but thank you very much… I have great hope that I will return to research someday." Rutherford, who was interested in treating women scientists as equals to men, became a role model for her. She continued to correspond with him for many years.

=== Return to Saint Petersburg ===
Szmidt returned to Saint Petersburg, via Oslo where she stayed with Gleditsch. She studied at Saint Petersburg State University from 1915 to 1916. During World War I, she looked after refugees and organised Polish-language schools. She wrote to her former mentor Ernest Rutherford that her care duties stopped her from undertaking research and mentioned concerns about her ill health, although she was more upbeat in other letters, particularly when she reported that she had passed her final examinations and would be able to apply for her degree once she presented an original research problem in the field of mathematics, physics or astronomy.

She joined the newly founded Saint Petersburg Polytechnic Institute, undertaking research under physicist Abram Ioffe who ran the institute. Ioffe wrote to his wife that "I am very pleased with Jadwiga [...]. She has a broad knowledge, good problem-solving skills, and also demonstrates exceptional laboratory skills". In 1918 Ioffe and others founded the X-ray and Radiological Institute. Ioffe became the long-standing director of the institute, which was renamed the Ioffe Institute after his death. Szmidt played a key role in the organisation of the institute. She oversaw the students' activities in the institute's Laboratory of Experimental Physics, and taught courses on radioactivity. At the same time, Szmidt took a particular interest in X-ray physics, preparing specialised monochromatic X-ray filters.

Following her marriage to the deputy director of the institute, A. A. Chernichev, Szmidt began working in electrical engineering, her husband's field of specialisation. Together, they worked on the precursors to television technology and were granted a patent for an oscilloscope. Unlike many women of her day, she did not simply take up domestic duties but continued to work actively with her husband on technology research.

In 1923, she and her husband hoped to attend the Congress of Electrical Engineers in Paris but this required a recommendation. On writing to Marie Curie, Jadwiga received the necessary support from her former mentor who remembered her well.

=== Later life ===
From 1924, Szmidt headed the Saint Petersburg Polytechnic Institute's vacuum electronics laboratory. In 1929, together with her husband, she travelled to the United States where she delivered a series of lectures.

As a result of her contacts with foreign scientists, in 1930 her name was added to a list of suspicious people under the Soviet regime. There is therefore no information available about her later life after this date. Her correspondence shows nevertheless that while in Leningrad, she remained in contact with her husband who had moved to Moscow in 1938. Jadwiga Szmidt, still in Leningrad, fell seriously ill, writing to her husband that her "condition had seriously worsened". She died there in April 1940 (exact date unknown), while her husband died in Moscow on the 18th.

Szmidt spoke six languages, which she used to translate a number of scientific works into Russian, including Michael Faraday’s book Experimental Researches in Electricity which was published in Russian after her death in 1947.

== See also ==
- List of women associated with Marie Curie and Irène Joliot-Curie
