= Livescribe =

Computing platform

Livescribe, Inc.
- Type: Private
- Founded: January 2007
- Founder: Jim Marggraff
- Headquarters: Oakland, California, U.S.
- Key people: Jim Marggraff (Chairman and CEO)
- Number of employees: approx. 100 (2011)
- Website: livescribe.com

Livescribe is a paper-based computing platform that consists of a digital pen, digital paper, software applications, and developer tools.

Central to the Livescribe platform is the smartpen, a ballpoint pen with an embedded computer and digital audio recorder. When used with Anoto digital paper, it records what it writes for later uploading to a computer, and synchronizes those notes with any audio it has recorded. This allows users to replay portions of a recording by tapping on the notes they were taking at the time the recording was made. It is also possible to select which portion of a recording to replay by clicking on the relevant portion of a page on-screen, once it has been synced to the Livescribe Desktop software.

Jim Marggraff, inventor of the LeapFrog FLY Pentop computer and creator of the LeapPad Learning System, left Leapfrog in 2005 to form Livescribe.

In November 2015, Livescribe announced its acquisition by Anoto for $15m.

== The smartpen ==
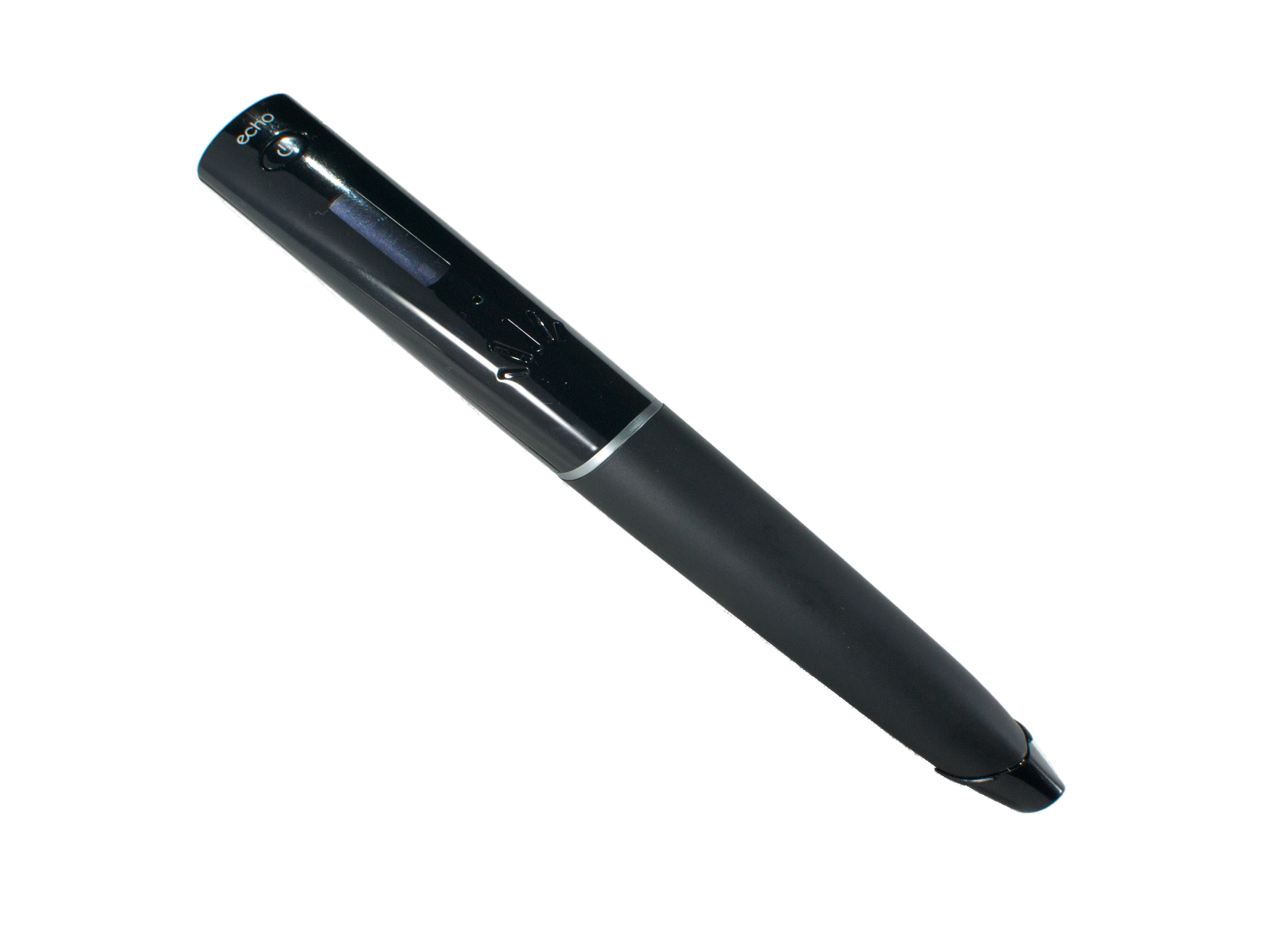
The Livescribe Echo Pen

A Livescribe smartpen is about the size and weight of a large pen (5/8" x 6 1/8"), and is equipped with a removable ball-point ink cartridge, a microphone to record audio, a speaker for playback, a small OLED display, an infra-red camera, and internal flash memory that captures handwritten notes, audio and drawings.

The user can choose to record audio in addition to the handwritten text. Recorded audio is kept indexed with the handwritten text—tapping on a written word starts playback of the recorded audio from that part of the recording.

The smartpen allows the installation of as many applications as there is memory, and ships with several applications. If tapped on the correct images, it can function as a calculator, for example, or can translate words (the translator software as shipped includes only 21 words in a small selection of languages - as of September 2010 there are no public plans to make a full version of this translator available).

Livescribe has made four versions of its smartpen: Pulse, Echo, Sky Wi-Fi (or Livescribe Wi-Fi), and Livescribe 3. The pens can store about 100 hours of audio per gigabyte.

- The Pulse smartpen, released in March 2008, is available with either 1, 2 or 4 Gigabytes of flash storage. It requires a special USB cradle and uses a 2.5mm headphone jack.
- The Echo smartpen, released in July 2010, comes with either 2GB, 4GB or 8 GB of memory. Compared to the Pulse smartpen, it is less round in shape and uses more standardized connection ports. The Echo integrates with the Desktop software via a standard micro USB cable and can connect to headphones with a more common 3.5-millimeter jack.
- In October 2012, Livescribe announced the Sky Wi-Fi smartpen, which uses Wi-Fi to transfer the notes and audio to Evernote without using the proprietary Livescribe Desktop software. In the European Union, this product is sold as the "Livescribe Wi-Fi smartpen" due to a trademark dispute with BSkyB.
- In November 2013, the Livescribe 3 was released. This uses Bluetooth Low Energy (BT 4.0) to store the page content and audio on a smart phone. The physical design made key changes. The OLED screen and the microphone were omitted and the smart phone's display and microphone were used instead. The pen's battery life improved and also still holds the written page content.
- In 2018 (after acquisition by Anoto) Aegir was released. The Aegir series features designs named after aquatic creatures: Marlin and Dolphin, each available in multiple colors.
- In 2020 Symphony was released. It featured OCR for converting handwriting to text in 27 languages, 128MB of storage capacity and integration with cloud popular services.

== Paper, applications, and sharing ==
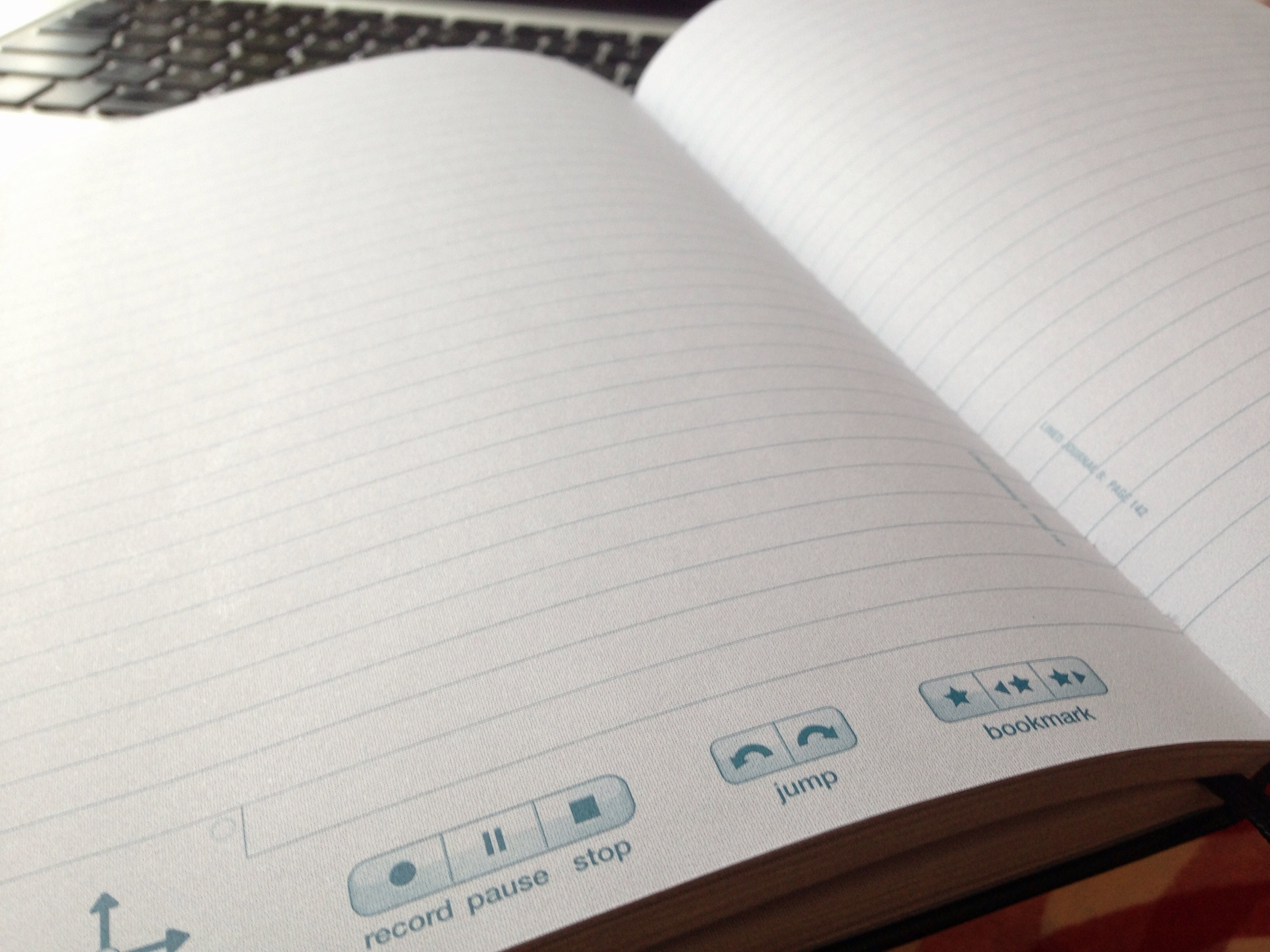
LiveScribe Dot Paper

Livescribe's special paper that allows the recording of notes uses a patented dot-positioning system licensed from Anoto.

=== The pattern ===
As with all Anoto pattern-based pens, the smartpen can only determine its position on the page when used with paper pre-printed with the dot pattern. Livescribe sells notebooks in several styles, and users can also print their own dot paper with a laser printer capable of at least 600 dpi. (A color or monochrome laser printer works.)

The Anoto pattern consists of numerous small black dots in patterns that are essentially invisible to the human eye, but can be detected by the pen's infrared camera. The pattern indicates the exact position of the digital pen on the page, and each page has a unique identity so that they can be distinguished from each other.

=== Sharing ===
Notes and audio can be sent to other users as a "pencast" through the Livescribe Desktop software. The Livescribe Connect service, launched in May 2011, allows pencasts to be sent through e-mail, Evernote, Facebook, Google Docs, and other methods. These can also be saved as an interactive Pencast PDF that can be viewed with versions 10 and higher of Adobe Reader.

While compatibility with OneNote 2010 was initially available, LiveScribe has not provided connectivity support for OneNote 2013.

== Developer tools ==
Livescribe developed a Penlet SDK to allow application development for the smartpen. The SDK was based on Java, and applications ran directly on the pen itself. Applications could display text and menus, as well as produce audio feedback. A Desktop SDK for Microsoft and Macintosh operating systems was also promised, to allow developers to access files stored on the pen.

On June 2, 2009, Livescribe announced the pre-release version of the SDK 1.0 for Windows at the 2009 JavaOne Conference. This was followed in December 2009, with the announcement of the global developer challenge to "...encourage the creation of compelling applications for the Pulse smartpen in 2010 and beyond."

On April 27, 2010, Livescribe announced the winners of the Developer Challenge:

- People's Choice Grand Prize Winner: nodewave MasterMind by Michel Bagnol
- Expert Panel Grand Prize Winner: Audible Healthcare by Charles Caraher
- People's Choice Category Winners
  - Productivity Category: nodewave SwissKnife All-in-One by Michel Bagnol
  - Entertainment Category: Sudoku by Chris Rogers
  - Education Category: iDK Words/Thesaurus by Phil Trevino; SpellingMe by Brad Rippe

In July 2011, Livescribe announced the closure of its third-party developer program. Livescribe's official reason for shutting the development program was to concentrate on "cloud access, storage and services." The closure of the developer program upset the developer community who had invested in the program, many of whom maintain an active campaign to convince Livescribe to bring back the program.

== Use and reception ==
From March 2008 through July 2010, Livescribe sold 400,000 smartpens. About thirty percent of the customers are college students, while the majority are professionals in fields such as journalism, law, or sales. Some universities issue Livescribe's products to students with learning disabilities to reduce the anxiety related to note-taking.

PC World rated the original Livescribe Pulse pen 93/100. A September 2011 review in the Associated Press compared the Livescribe Echo pen to an iPad for the purpose of note-taking and concluded that the Echo is "the best tool". Livescribe was named one of BusinessWeek's "Fifty Best Tech Startups" in June 2009. Awards earned by Livescribe include the Codie award, the Editor's Choice Award of MacLife, and the Silicon Valley Business Journal's Emerging Tech Award.

Some users have noted that ambient noise can be a problem. The built-in microphone on the pen can pick up small amounts of noise from writing on paper, and adjacent ambient noise is often louder than a far away speaker. However, the included headphones have embedded microphones that reduce this ambient noise. (Headphones for the Echo must be purchased separately).

The smartpen's portable size and audio recording capabilities have led some people to question the ethics and legality of using the device. For example, in 2009, Delta Air Lines accused the manager of Atlanta's airport of using a Livescribe pen to illegally record a meeting of city and airline officials without their consent. The City of Atlanta concluded an investigation of this matter the following year and failed to find sufficient evidence that the airport manager intentionally sought to record the airline's private conversations. Livescribe urges its customers to "behave ethically and demonstrate common courtesy when it comes to personal privacy" as they would with common devices such as cameras and cellular telephones.

Some users have expressed frustration with the perceived lack of responsiveness to requests for functionality improvements. Among the most requested improvements are the ability to print forms onto dot pattern paper and a day planner for use with the pen system. These requests began to surface soon after release of the pen system; however, responses from the company are infrequent and tend to be perfunctory.

== OLED problems ==
There appear to be design flaws with the OLED display or possibly with the firmware on the Pulse, Echo and Sky (WiFi) models. The OLED fades after one to three years, making the pen significantly more difficult to use because it is no longer possible to see if the pen is on or not and customers need to rely on the audio feedback alone. This fading issue is a known disadvantage of OLEDs and results in a limited lifespan. Users have complained to Livescribe, and the company's official response is to point users to tips on pen maintenance and then suggest that users buy a new pen at a deep discount as a replacement. Some users who received a replacement saw it plagued by the same problem. However, the company has taken advantage of ongoing improvements in OLED technology and, as of January 1, 2015, now offers a 3-year warranty on new smartpens (including the discounted replacements). The OLED issue has alienated some Livescribe users, especially with the high price tags of the accessories and of the smartpen itself. Once the OLED display fails: Many cellphone cameras can see the IR light emitted when the pen is on so using the camera to look at the front of the pen and depressing the ink cartridge is one way of determining the operating status. Additionally, using the Volume Up/Down icons will cause a beep when the pen is on. Unfortunately, there is no way to determine if the pen is actually recording audio without the OLED indications thus rendering useless one of its primary functions. Livescribe offers free, fully warrantied replacements to customers who experience an issue with their OLED displays when their pen is in warranty. For US customers whose smartpens are out-of-warranty, the company offers replacement options that allow customers to purchase a fully warrantied replacement pen for a discounted price.
