= Galinka Ehrenfest =

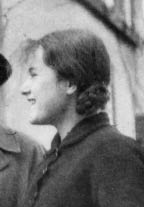
- Galinka Ehrenfest in 1930
- Born: 23 July 1910; Kannuka, Governorate of Estonia, Russian Empire
- Died: 12 August 1979 (aged 69); Gronsveld, Limburg, Netherlands
- Occupation: Author
- Spouse: Jaap Kloot
- Parent(s): Tatyana Afanasyeva-Ehrenfest (mother) and Paul Ehrenfest (father)
- Relatives: Tatyana van Aardenne-Ehrenfest (sister)
- Writing career
- Pen name: El Pintor
- Genre: Children's literature

Galinka Ehrenfest (23 July 1910 – 12 August 1979) was a Dutch writer and illustrator of children's books and designer of children's games. She became a naturalized Dutch citizen in 1922.

== Biography ==
Galinka Ehrenfest was born in the former village of Kannuka (now part of Sillamäe), Estonia, as the second daughter of Austrian Jewish theoretical physicist Paul Ehrenfest and Russian mathematician Tatyana Afanasyeva-Ehrenfest. Her sister, mathematician Tatyana van Aardenne-Ehrenfest, was five years older than her, and later had two younger brothers: Paul Jr. and Wassili, who was born with Down syndrome. Wassili was killed in 1933 by his father in a murder-suicide at the age of 15, whilst Paul was killed in 1939 by an avalanche in the French Alps.

Because her father was appointed professor of mathematics and physics at Leiden University in 1912, succeeding Hendrik Lorentz, the family relocated to Leiden that year. They initially lived in Groenhovenstraat but, shortly before the outbreak of the First World War, moved to a house in Witte Rozenstraat designed by her mother. The building, now known as the Ehrenfesthuis, is a designated national monument.

Galinka began work at a disabled children’s clinic in Jena at the age pf 17, at which Wassili was taught. A few years later she departed for the United States of America, where she held several jobs, including as a doll maker for the Yale Puppeteers.

She returned to Leiden in 1933. After her father's suicide that same year, she remained in for some time Leiden to support her mother before later moving to Amsterdam.

Ehrenfest was married to artist Jaap Kloot, who ran the publishing house Corunda, with whom she authored books under the pen name El Pintor (Spanish for "The Painter"). They met at an art school in 1935. They married on June 11, 1941.

They were captured by the Nazis on May 30 1943 and Kloot died at the Sobibór extermination camp on July 2. Galinka, who was heavily pregnant, was interrogated for a week. She told a false story, after which she was released, but suffered severe malnutrition and lost her unborn child. She continued making picture books as El Pintor until 1946, first with Godfried Bomans, then with Jef Last. In total, seventeen El Pintor books were published. On 23 May 1949, Ehrenfest remarried to Hendrik van Bommel.

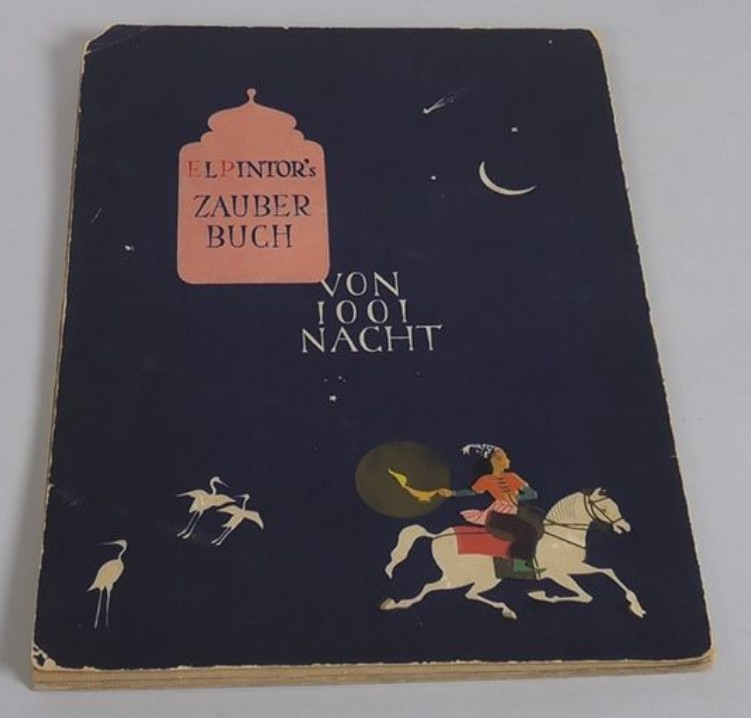
El Pintor's "Zauberbuch von 1001 Nacht"

Ehrenfest donated profits from her books to the Dutch Resistance during the Second World War. Following the war, she became an interior designer specializing in children's rooms and fought the rights of childcare providers.

Ehrenfest died in 1979 in Gronsveld, Netherlands, aged 69.
