= Ehrenfesthuis =

Coordinates: 52°09′05″N 4°29′01″E

The Ehrenfesthuis (Ehrenfest house) was the residence of physicist Paul Ehrenfest and his family in Leiden, Netherlands, remaining in family ownership until the 1980s. The family hosted many notable guests including Albert Einstein in the house.

Construction began in the summer of 1913 and was completed in July 1914. The house consists of two storeys and a pitched attic, and is equipped with a cellar. It has four plastered cornice facades, a closed street façade and three more open façades with pediments on the garden sides. It was designed by Tatiana Afanassjewa-Ehrenfest and was inspired by Russian Neoclassicism.

During the 1970s two plaques were installed at the house to commemorate Ehrenfest and his wife. The house is now a designated national monument.

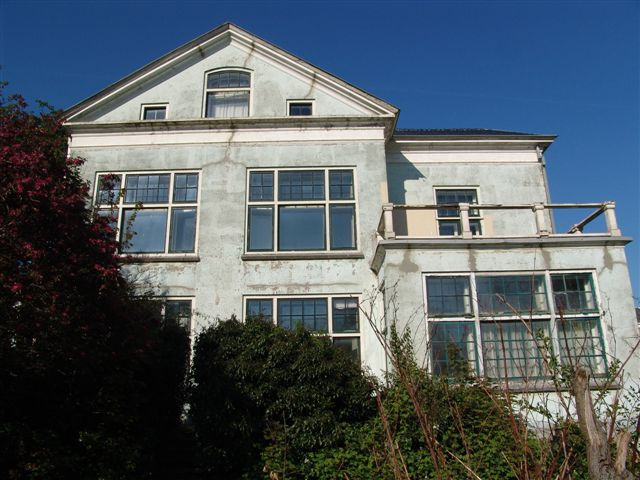
The Ehrenfesthuis in 2005

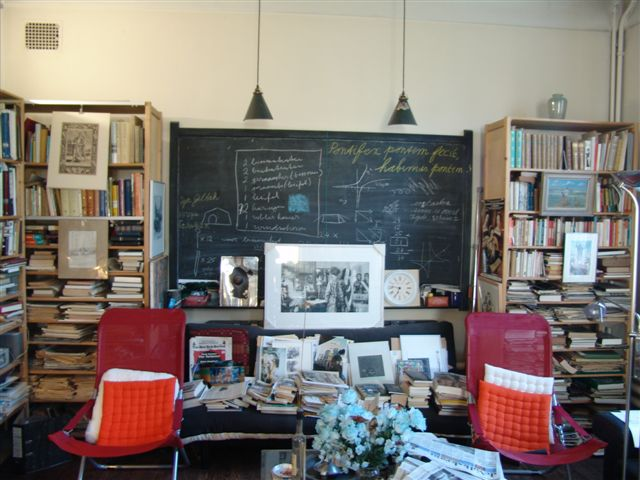
The blackboard of the Ehrenfesthuis

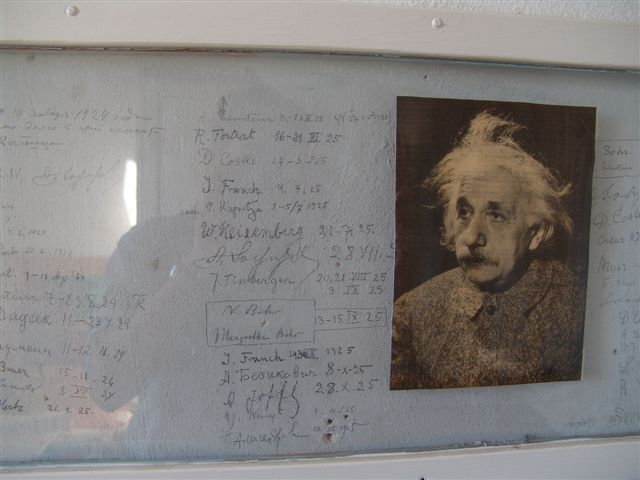
The signature wall of the Ehrenfesthuis
