= Fly (pentop computer) =

Digital pen computer system

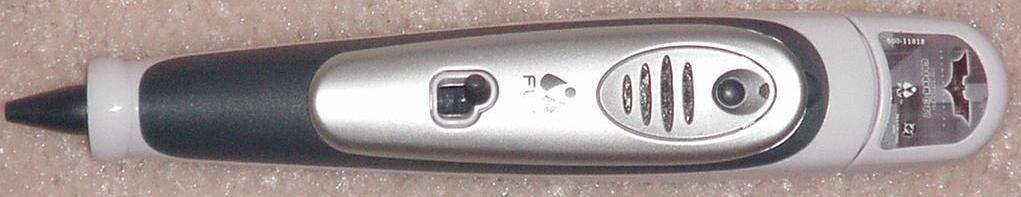
A typical Fly pen with a Batman Begins game cartridge

The Fly Pentop Computer and FLY Fusion Pentop Computer are personal electronics products manufactured by LeapFrog Enterprises Inc. They are called a "pentop" computer by its manufacturer, because they consist of a pen with a computer inside.

In 2009, LeapFrog discontinued both the manufacture and support of the device and all accessory products, such as notepads and ink refills which are required for continued use. The inventor of the FLY Pentop, Jim Marggraff, left LeapFrog and founded Livescribe in January 2007.

== Description ==
The Fly, released in 2005, is a customizable pen that is intended to assist children with schoolwork. There are several bundled and add-on applications available, including a notepad, calculator, language and writing assistant, and educational games; many of these require the use of a small cartridge that can be inserted into a port built into the rear of the pen. The Fly only works on its own proprietary digital paper, which is lightly printed with a pattern of dots to provide positioning information to the pen via a tiny infrared camera. The ink tip itself can be retracted into the body of the pen when no physical notes are desired.

The pen uses digital paper and pattern decoding technology developed by Anoto to track where the user writes on the page. It uses Vision Objects' MyScript character recognition technology to read what's been written, and can read aloud nearly any word in U.S. English. One notable thing is that the Fly uses only capital letters. To start the main menu of the base pen, the user writes "M" and circles it. After recognizing the circled "M", the pen switches to "menu mode". There are several different circle-letter codes for activating different applications, these codes are officially known as "Fly-Cons."

Once an application is activated, the user uses the pen to draw on the paper to interact with the application. In much of the applications, users are told what to draw, rather than having the freedom to design their own.

== Applications and add-ons ==
LeapFrog sold several different types of paper with which the pen could be used, often in conjunction with a related programming cartridge. The paper may include special instructions for using the pen, as well as cosmetic alterations to the paper reflecting the subject for which it is intended.

Activities available for the Fly included a Spanish language translator, spelling and mathematical software, and a personal journal. Activities for the Fly pen came in packs that include a game pad - a different piece of digital paper - or a cartridge. Using a game pad begins with the user "downloading" the game from the paper by swiping the pen along a Fly Strip, reminiscent of a barcode. Available games include Batman Begins, a "Flyball" baseball game, Harry Potter Interactive Marauder's Map, and a musical DJ game called "Scratch".

== Response ==
Many critics of the computer have pointed out the length of time required for the pen to correctly recognise input from the user. Also, some have criticized the lack of a screen, since audio feedback and lights are the only way to get a response from the devices.

== Fly Fusion Pentop Computer ==
=== The Digital Pen ===
The FLY Fusion Pentop Computer is the second and last version of the FLY 1.0 Pentop Computer. This pen, like its predecessor, is included with digitized paper that allows the pen's camera (located near to the pen's tip) to "read" what you write. The pen still uses the familiar "FLYcons" and can play compatible games.

As of 2009, LeapFrog had discontinued both versions of the FLY Pentop Computer. This also included a halt of all support accessories such as notepads and ink refills which are required for continued use of the pen. The inventor of the FLY Pentop, Jim Marggraff, left LeapFrog and founded Livescribe in January 2007.

=== Differences From the FLY 1.0 ===
The pen is much smaller and thinner than the original FLY 1.0 Pentop Computer. Also, it is now a silver color with dark grey accents. The FLY Fusion can upload and transfer text that was written on paper to a word-processing program, such as Microsoft Word. MP3 music files can also be downloaded to the pen, allowing it to double as an MP3 player. It came with three songs preloaded on it. The calculator application has been updated so the user can tap the "math" FLYcon, and write the problem that they wish to calculate. Also, it can translate an English word into Spanish, and vice versa, by writing the word on the digitized paper.

=== Backwards Compatibility ===
FLY Fusion pentop chips and accessories will not work in an original FLY 1.0 Pentop Computer. Also, some FLY 1.0 products, such as "Fly through Algebra" contain a chip that will not fit into the FLY Fusion pentop computer's slot, and cannot be used with the updated FLY Fusion.

== See also ==
- Digital paper
- Digital pen
- Pen computing
