= Oxford Papershow =

Oxford Papershow is a portable digital writing kit that was launched in the summer of 2008. It was developed for use in presentations, meetings and for personal use. It incorporates Bluetooth technology, a pen and bespoke paper. Anything that is written on the paper with the pen appears on the computer, projector or plasma screen instantly.

== Overview ==
The technology involves a USB key to synchronise with the digital pen enabling instant connectivity between pen and PC. Any additions or annotations made with the pen will happen in real time to digital flipcharts or PowerPoint presentations. Shape, colours and arrows can be created by tapping the pen on a command menu in the paper's margin. It also includes an undo and erase feature.

Workbooks can be saved as PDF which are stored on the USB key or can be emailed to attendees of the meeting, presentation or conference.

This technology is compatible with Windows XP/SP2, Windows Vista and Windows 7 32/64bits and will work on any Windows enabled PC or laptop. The MAC version is compatible with Tiger, Leopard and Snow Leopard and a Mac Lion version is currently in development.

The digital pen and USB key have a connectivity range of up to eight metres, allowing users to roam without the fear of tripping over wires, or to pass the pen and pad from person to person freely.

All the software and the vPapershow documents are stored on Flash memory of the key which also embed the Bluetooth chip.

Phill Jupitus demonstrates how to use the Papershow

== Technology ==
Papershow uses the Anoto technology which allows transmission of the device's output directly to computer.

Microscopic points are pre-printed on the paper, working as locators. As the pen moves across this surface, a micro-camera below the ball-point captures the pen's position on the sheet at a rate of 75 Hz.

The position co-ordinates are sent to the Papershow software which instantaneously reproduces the writing's line.
