= Pyotr Lukirsky =

Soviet physicist (1894–1954)

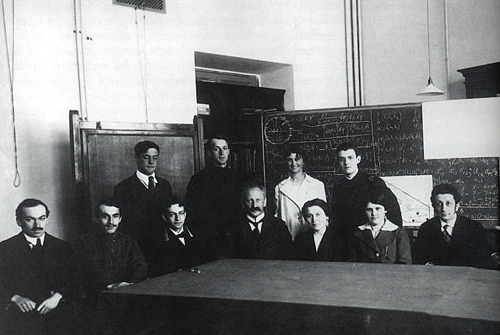
Lukirsky in 1915, standing second from left, with other students of Abram Ioffe (seated fourth from left)

Pyotr Ivanovich Lukirsky (Russian: Пётр Иванович Лукирский; 13 December 1894 – 16 November 1954) was a Soviet physicist who specialized in experimental physics in radiation and optics. He was a student of Abram Ioffe and became a fellow of the Physico-Technical Institute. He contributed to industrial developments as well as to crystallography and basic physics.

== Life and work ==
Lukirsky was born in Orenburg where his father was a land surveyor. He was educated at Novgorod where the family moved and in 1912 he joined St. Petersburg University and graduated in 1915. He attended the seminars in physics of A. F. Ioffe. In 1918 he became a fellow at the physics institute founded by Ioffe and began to work on electron scattering from the surface of liquid mercury. He experimentally measured Planck constant with great accuracy. He also worked on X-ray (10–150 Å) scattering, conducted experiments on the polarization of X-rays, Compton scattering and photoelectric ion emission (the so-called photoeffect). In the 1930's he was a research consultant in the production of vacuum tubes at the Svetlana plant. He was also a noted lecturer and taught at the Leningrad University from 1919 to 1938. In 1938 he was arrested on charges of "fascist" activities by the NKVD (as part of Stalin's Great Purge which targeted a number of other physicists including Pyotr Kapitsa and Matvei Bronstein. Bronstein had been involved in the hiring of Lukirsky.) and sent to a labour camp in Usollag and was rehabilitated only in 1942 after numerous petitions from his colleague physicists. After his release he returned to the Physico-Technical Institute, heading it from 1945. He also worked at the Radium Institute from 1943 and was involved in problems in nuclear physics.
