= De Bruijn–Newman constant =

Mathematical constant

The de Bruijn–Newman constant, denoted by $\Lambda$ and named after Nicolaas Govert de Bruijn and Charles Michael Newman, is a mathematical constant defined via the zeros of a certain function $H(\lambda,z)$, where $\lambda$ is a real parameter and $z$ is a complex variable. More precisely,

$$H(\lambda, z):=\int_{0}^{\infty} e^{\lambda u^{2}} \Phi(u) \cos (z u) \, du$$,

where $\Phi$ is the super-exponentially decaying function

$$\Phi(u) = \sum_{n=1}^{\infty} (2\pi^2n^4e^{9u}-3\pi n^2 e^{5u} ) e^{-\pi n^2 e^{4u}}$$

and $\Lambda$ is the unique real number with the property that $H$ has only real zeros if and only if $\lambda\geq \Lambda$.

The constant is closely connected to the Riemann hypothesis. Indeed, the Riemann hypothesis is equivalent to the statement that $\Lambda\leq 0$. Brad Rodgers and Terence Tao proved that $\Lambda\geq 0$, so the Riemann hypothesis is equivalent to $\Lambda=0$. A simplified proof of the Rodgers–Tao result was later given by Alexander Dobner.

== History ==
De Bruijn showed in 1950 that $H$ has only real zeros if $\lambda\geq 1/2$, and moreover, that if $H$ has only real zeros for some $\lambda$, $H$ also has only real zeros if $\lambda$ is replaced by any larger value. Newman proved in 1976 the existence of a constant $\Lambda$ for which the "if and only if" claim holds; and this then implies that $\Lambda$ is unique. Newman also conjectured that $\Lambda\geq 0$, which was proven forty years later, by Brad Rodgers and Terence Tao in 2018.

== Heat-flow interpretation ==
The family $H_\lambda$ may be viewed as a deformation of the Riemann xi function under a heat-type equation. At $\lambda=0$, the function $H_0$ is essentially the Riemann xi function, written as an even Fourier transform. Varying $\lambda$ multiplies the Fourier-side kernel by $e^{\lambda u^2}$. Differentiating under the integral sign gives

$${\partial H_\lambda\over\partial \lambda}=-{\partial^2 H_\lambda\over\partial z^2},$$

so that increasing $\lambda$ evolves $H_\lambda$ by the backward heat equation in the variable $z$.

In this interpretation, the de Bruijn–Newman constant is the transition time at which the deformation changes from having non-real zeros to having only real zeros. De Bruijn's theorem says that once all zeros have become real, they remain real for all later values of the heat-flow parameter. Thus $\Lambda$ measures the stability of the real-zero property under this deformation: the Riemann hypothesis is the assertion that the undeformed function $H_0$ already lies on the real-zero side of the transition, while Newman's conjecture asserts that it lies exactly at the boundary rather than safely inside it.

== Proofs of Newman's conjecture ==
Newman's conjecture is the assertion that $\Lambda\geq 0$. The proof of this lower bound by Brad Rodgers and Terence Tao proceeds by contradiction. Assuming $\Lambda<0$, they analyze the motion of the zeros of $H_t$ under the backwards heat-flow deformation. Their analysis forces increasingly rigid control of the zeros in the range $\Lambda<t\leq 0$. In particular, they prove that it implies that the zeros of $H_0$ would have to be locally close to equally spaced. They then derive a contradiction with known results on the local distribution of zeros of the Riemann zeta function, such as estimates related to Montgomery's pair correlation work.

A different proof was later given by Alexander Dobner. Dobner's method avoids the zero-dynamics and zeta-zero gap estimates used by Rodgers and Tao. In the case of the Riemann xi function, the argument shows that for every $t<0$, the deformed function $\xi_t$ can be approximated by a Dirichlet series

$$\zeta_t(s)=\sum_{n=1}^{\infty}\exp\!\left({t\over4}\log^2 n\right)n^{-s},$$

whose zeros imply the existence of zeros of $\xi_t$ off the critical line, equivalently non-real zeros of the corresponding $H_t$, where the relationship is given by

$$H_t(z)={1\over 8}\,\xi_t\!\left({1+iz\over 2}\right).$$

Dobner's proof also gives a generalized form of Newman's conjecture for $L$-functions in the extended Selberg class.

== Upper bounds ==
De Bruijn's upper bound of $\Lambda\le 1/2$ was not improved until 2008, when Ki, Kim and Lee proved $\Lambda< 1/2$, making the inequality strict.

In December 2018, the 15th Polymath project improved the bound to $\Lambda\leq 0.22$. A manuscript of the Polymath work was submitted to arXiv in late April 2019, and was published in the journal Research In the Mathematical Sciences in August 2019.

This bound was further slightly improved in April 2020 by Platt and Trudgian to $\Lambda\leq 0.2$.

== Historical bounds ==
Historical lower bounds
Year	Lower bound on Λ
1987	−50
1990	−5
1991	−0.0991
1993	−5.895×10^{−9}
2000	−2.7×10^{−9}
2011	−1.1×10^{−11}
2018	0

Historical upper bounds
Year	Upper bound on Λ
1950	0.5
2008	< 0.5
2019	0.22
2020	0.2
