= Tatyana Afanasyeva-Ehrenfest =

Russian-Dutch mathematician and physicist (1876–1964)

- Татьяна Афанасьева-Эренфест
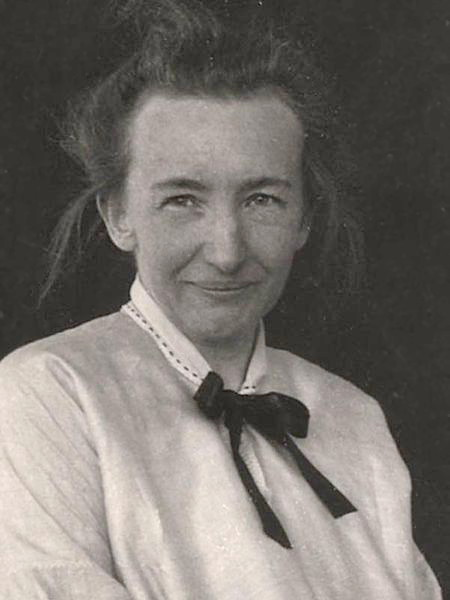
- Tatyana Afanasyeva c. 1910
- Born: Tatyana Alexeyevna Afanasyeva; Татьяна Алексеевна Афанасьева; 19 November 1876; Kiev, Russian Empire
- Died: 14 April 1964 (aged 87); Leiden, Netherlands
- Citizenship: Russia, Netherlands
- Education: Women's University in St Petersburg; University of Göttingen
- Known for: Ehrenfest model
- Spouse: Paul Ehrenfest (m. 1904–1933)
- Children: 4, including Tatyana and Galinka
- Scientific career
- Fields: Statistical mechanics

Tatyana Alexeyevna Afanasyeva-Ehrenfest (Note: Alternatively Dutchified as Afanassjewa.) (née Afanasyeva; Russian: Татьяна Алексеевна Афанасьева-Эренфест; 19 November 1876 – 14 April 1964) was a Russian-Dutch mathematician and physicist who made contributions to the fields of statistical mechanics and statistical thermodynamics with her husband Paul Ehrenfest.

== Early life ==
Tatyana Afanasyeva was born in Kiev, in the Russian Empire (present-day Ukraine). Her father was Alexander Afanasyev, a chief engineer on the Imperial Railways, who would bring Tatyana on his travels around the Russian Empire. Her father died while she was still young, so she moved to St Petersburg in Russia to live with her aunt Sonya, and uncle Peter Afanasyev, a professor at the St. Petersburg Polytechnic Institute.

Afanasyeva attended normal school in St. Petersburg with a specialty in mathematics and science. At the time, women were not allowed to attend universities in Russian territory, so after graduating from normal school, Tatyana began studying mathematics and physics at the Women's University in St Petersburg under Orest Chvolson. In 1902, she transferred to the University of Göttingen in Germany to continue her studies with Felix Klein and David Hilbert.

At the University of Göttingen, Afanasyeva met Paul Ehrenfest. When Ehrenfest discovered that Afanasyeva could not attend a mathematics club meeting, he argued with the school to have the rule changed. A friendship developed between the two, and they married on 21 December 1904, later returned to St. Petersburg in 1907. Under Russian law, marriage was not allowed between two people of different religions. Since Tatyana was a Russian Orthodox and Ehrenfest was Jewish, they both decided to officially renounce their religions in order to remain married. They had two daughters and two sons; one daughter, Tatyana Ehrenfest, also became a mathematician.

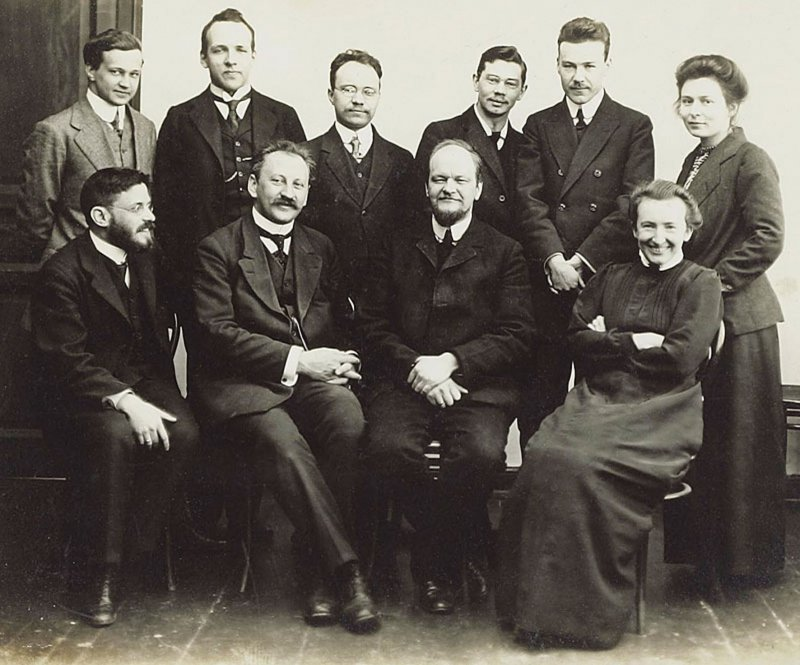
St. Petersburg circle of physicists. Sitting (from left to right): Paul Ehrenfest, Abram Ioffe, Dmitry Rozhdestvensky, Tatyana Afanasyeva. Standing (from left to right): Vladimir Chulanovsky, G. Weichardt, L. Isakov, G. Perlitz, Victor Robertovich Bursian, Jadwiga Szmidt

In 1912, they moved to Leiden in the Netherlands, where Paul Ehrenfest was appointed to succeed Hendrik Lorentz as professor at the University of Leiden, and where the couple lived throughout their career.

== Works in mathematics and physics ==
Initially, Afanasyeva-Ehrenfest collaborated closely with her husband, most famously on their classic 1911 review of the statistical mechanics of Ludwig Boltzmann. The Conceptual Foundations of the Statistical Approach in Mechanics, by Paul and Tatyana Ehrenfest was originally published in 1911 as an article for the German Encyklopädie der mathematischen Wissenschaften (Encyclopedia of Mathematical Sciences), and has since been translated and republished.

The Ehrenfest model of diffusion results from her work with her husband in 1907.

Afanasyeva-Ehrenfest published many papers on various topics such as randomness and entropy, and teaching geometry to children.

== Contact with Einstein ==
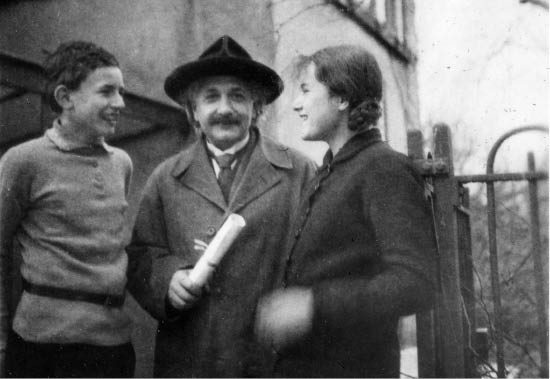
Albert Einstein standing between Paul jr. and Galinka Ehrenfest outside their house in Leiden, late 1920s or early 1930s

Albert Einstein was a frequent guest in the 1920s to her home at Witte Rozenstraat 57 in Leiden, as evidenced by the many signatures on the wall. Later Einstein departed for Princeton University and he and Afanasyeva corresponded. The archives of Museum Boerhaave in Leiden has three letters to her from Einstein.

Afanasyeva-Ehrenfest contacted Einstein for his advice on her manuscript on thermodynamics and inquired about a translator. She wanted to give thermodynamics a rigorous mathematical foundation which was lacking and describe pressure, temperature and entropy in changing systems. Einstein responded on 12 August 1947 that he applauded her approach but he also had some criticisms:

"Ich habe den Eindruck gewonnen, dass Sie ein bisschen von logischen Putzteufel besessen sind, und dass daran die Übersichtlichkeit des Buches leide."
(Translation: I have got the impression, that you are possessed somewhat by a logical polishing devil, and that the clarity of the book suffers.)

Einstein did not suggest a translator and sent the manuscript back to Afanasyeva-Ehrenfest who paid herself for its publication in 1956 as Die Grundlagen der Thermodynamik with Brill Publishers in Leiden with some, but not all of Einstein's corrections.

== Legacy ==
The Dutch Physics Council sponsors the Ehrenfest-Afanassjewa thesis award.

== Sources ==
- Klein, Martin J. (1972). The making of a theoretical physicist (1. ed., 2. print. ed.). Amsterdam: North-Holland Publ. ISBN 978-0720401639.
- Pyenson, Lewis (1995). "Ehrenfest, Tatyana Afanaseva". In McMurray, Emily J.; Kosek, Jane Kelly; Valade III, Roger M. (eds.). Notable twentieth-century scientists. Detroit, MI: Gale Research. ISBN 9780810391819.
