= Gerhard Heinrich Dieke =

German-American physicist (1901–1965)

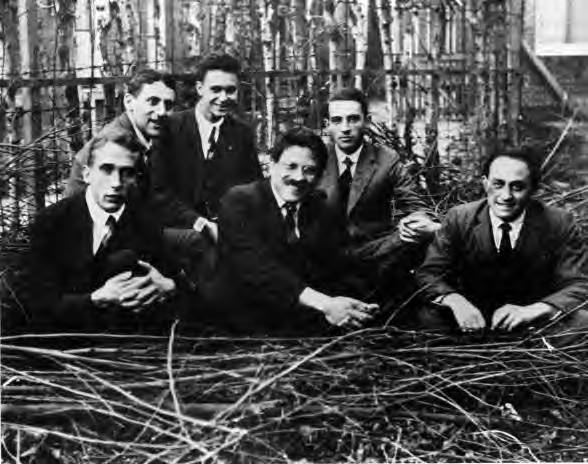
1924 in Leiden. Left to right: Gerhard Heinrich Dieke, Samuel Abraham Goudsmit, Jan Tinbergen, Paul Ehrenfest, Ralph Kronig, Enrico Fermi

Gerhard Heinrich Dieke (1901 in Rheda, Germany – August 26, 1965 in Aberdeen, Scotland) was a German/U.S. physicist. He was a pioneer in investigating the structure of atoms and molecules by spectroscopic methods. Dieke studied at the University of Leiden under Paul Ehrenfest, and received a Ph.D. in physics at the University of California in 1926. After completing his graduate studies, he worked at the Institute of Physical and Chemical Research in Tokyo and in 1929 he was Dirk Coster's assistant at the University of Groningen in the Netherlands. Dieke joined the department of physics at Johns Hopkins University in 1930 as an associate professor, and he later served as chairman of the department, 1950-1965.

Dieke was a man of wide interests, and was an expert on the taxonomy of lady beetles (Coccinellidae). In 1947 he authored a review of the genus Epilachna based on the collections of the Smithsonian Museum and others.

Dieke was elected a correspondent of the Royal Netherlands Academy of Arts and Sciences in 1952.
