= Arend Joan Rutgers =

Dutch chemist (1903–1998)

- Born: 20 October 1903; Almelo, Netherlands
- Died: 2 September 1998 (aged 94); Almen, Netherlands
- Education: University of Amsterdam; University of Leiden (Ph.D.)
- Scientific career
- Fields: Surface chemistry, Electrokinetics
- Thesis: Bijdrage tot de theorie der thermoelectriciteit in kristallen (Contribution to the theory of thermo-electricity in crystals)
- Academic advisors: Paul Ehrenfest

Arend Joan Rutgers (20 October 1903 – 2 September 1998) was a Dutch-Belgian physical chemist.

Arend Joan Rutgers went to high school in Almelo, after which he studied chemistry at the University of Amsterdam. He later obtained his master's degree in 1926 he went to Leiden, where he studied theoretical physics under Paul Ehrenfest. In 1930, he obtained his Ph.D. from the University of Leiden and completed a thesis titled "Bijdrage tot de theorie der thermoelectriciteit in kristallen." (Contribution to the theory of thermo-electricity in crystals). In 1931, he returned to Amsterdam and worked as a research assistant.

In 1933, he became a lecturer at Ghent University in Belgium. In 1938, he was promoted to full professor, and he remained in Ghent until his retirement in 1974. Most of his scientific research was on colloids and surface chemistry, focussing on electrokinetics.

Rutgers was elected a correspondent of the Royal Netherlands Academy of Arts and Sciences in 1948.
