= Cedric Smith (statistician) =

British statistician and geneticist (1917–2002)

- Born: 5 February 1917; Leicester, England
- Died: 10 January 2002 (aged 84)
- Education: University College School, London; Trinity College, Cambridge (PhD 1942)
- Known for: Mathematical methods for mapping genes
- Scientific career
- Fields: Statistics, mathematical genetics
- Workplaces: Addenbrooke's Hospital, Cambridge; Galton Laboratory, University College London

Cedric Austen Bardell Smith (5 February 1917 – 10 January 2002) was a British statistician and geneticist. Smith was born in Leicester. He was the younger son of John Bardell Smith (1876–1950), a mechanical engineer, and Ada (née Horrocks; 1876–1969). He was educated at Wyggeston Grammar School for Boys until 1929, when the family moved to London. His education continued at Bec School, Tooting, for three years, then at University College School, London. In 1935, although having failed his Higher School Certificate, he was awarded an exhibition to Trinity College, Cambridge. He graduated in the Mathematical Tripos, with a First in Part II in 1937 and a Distinction in Part III in 1938. Following graduation he began postgraduate research, taking his PhD in 1942.

== Work on combinatorics ==
While a student at Cambridge, Smith became close friends with three other students at Trinity College, Leonard Brooks, Arthur Stone and William Tutte. Together they tackled a number of problems in the mathematical field of combinatorics and devised an imaginary mathematician, Blanche Descartes, under which name to publish their work. The group studied dissections of rectangles into squares, especially the 'perfect' squared square, a square that is divided into a number of smaller squares, no two of which are the same size. Publications under the name of Blanche Descartes or F. de Carteblanche continued to appear into the 1980s. The group also published more mainstream articles under their own names, the final one in 1992.

== World War II ==
During World War II, as a Quaker and conscientious objector, Smith joined the Friends Relief Service; he worked as a hospital porter at Addenbrooke's Hospital in Cambridge. Smith's pacifist views saw him develop an interest in peace studies. Among other responsibilities for the Society of Friends, he was a member of the Quaker Peace Studies Trust which established the chair of Peace Studies at the University of Bradford. Smith was also a founder member (and Chairman) of the Conflict Research Society.

== Post-war career ==
In 1946 he was appointed Assistant Lecturer at the Galton Laboratory at University College London. He remained at UCL for the rest of his career, becoming successively Lecturer and Reader, before appointment as Weldon Professor of Biometry in 1964. On his arrival at UCL, Smith was influenced by J. B. S. Haldane, who introduced him to problems of linkage in human genetics in which field he was able to bring his skills as a statistician to bear. He invented some of the mathematical methods used to map human genes. In 1955, he invented the "gene counting" method of inferring gene frequencies from the frequencies of genotypes in populations. This was an early example of the EM Algorithm, over 20 years before its introduction by Dempster and co-workers. He gave a more general discussion of the gene-counting method and its statistical properties in 1957.

Smith was elected a Fellow of the Royal Statistical Society in 1945. He was a member of the Genetical Society (serving as Treasurer), the International Biometric Society (British Region), serving as President 1971–1972, and the International Statistical Institute.

== Other interests ==
He was a member of the advisory committee to the Anti-Concorde Project.

== Family ==
In 1957 he married Piroska Vermes (1921–2000), known as 'Piri'. They had one son, who survived them. Piri's father, Dr. Paul Vermes (1897–1968), was a Hungarian refugee who became a professional mathematician at the age of 50.

== See also ==
- BEST theorem
