= Vavilov State Optical Institute =

Russian research institute

The Vavilov State Optical Institute in St Petersburg, Russia (named after Sergey Ivanovich Vavilov) is a research institute in optics in Russia. It works both in pure and applied optics.

It was established in 1918 along the lines of a proposal by the physicist Dimitri Rozhdestvensky, who was the first director, a post he held until 1932. It is part of the Shvabe holding.

It designs optical systems (Froptas In German) for many applications, including Russian reconnaissance satellites. It publishes the Journal of Optical Technology (Научно-технический «ОПТИЧЕСКИЙ ЖУРНАЛ»).

Institution also known for developing of GOI polishing paste.

== History ==
=== Foundation of the Institute ===
The organization and deployment of the traffic police took place in several stages, which took about a year in total. The leading role in this process was played by D. S. Rozhdestvensky, who at that time was the head of the Physics Institute of Petrograd University and at the same time chairman of the Department of Optometry of the Commission for the Study of the Natural Productive Forces of Russia (KEPS) at the Russian Academy of Sciences.

The Department of Optical Engineering arose in April 1918, and in May, at the initiative and request of Rozhdestvensky, a computing bureau and an experimental optical workshop were established under him. Later, D. S. Rozhdestvensky linked the formation of the institute with these events and said that the GOI "originated" in May 1918.

On December 15, 1918, the first organizational meeting of the Scientific Council of the GOI was held under the chairmanship of D. S. Rozhdestvensky. It adopted the Regulations on the Institute and a note on the goals and objectives of the institute, intended for submission to the People's Commissariat for Education. In addition, a number of organizational issues were considered. The note provided an overview of the state of optical science and technology in Russia and in the leading countries of the West, it justified the need to unite optical specialists in an organization that enjoys broad state support, and formulated the main tasks of the newly created institute for the next period of its activity.

== Directors ==
- Interim CEO: Bezborodkin Pavel Vladimirovich (from 2021)
