= Anoto =

Swedish cloud-based software provider

Anoto Group AB (publ)
- Type: Public (Nasdaq Stockholm: ANOT)
- Industry: SaaS
- Predecessor: C Technologies
- Headquarters: Stockholm, Sweden
- Revenue: 173 MSEK
- Operating income: 8.9 MSEK
- Number of employees: ca. 40
- Website: http://www.anoto.com

Anoto Group AB (formerly C Technologies) is a Swedish cloud-based software provider (SaaS).

== Products ==
=== Digital Pen ===
The Digital Pen is an ink pen combined with a digital camera that digitally records everything that is written. It works by recognizing a non-repeating dot pattern printed on the paper. The non-repeating nature of the pattern means that the pen is able to determine which page is being written on, and where on the page the pen is.

The dot pattern can be printed on a professional offset printing press or on a laser printer. Dots are printed in black; other colors of ink are invisible to the pen's IR sensor. On a color laser printer, CMY can be mixed to produce a near-black color that is human-readable. For offset printing, Anoto developed an ink color called "Anoto substitute black", a non-carbon-based black ink that is invisible in the IR region, allowing the user to include human-readable black marks with the dot pattern without interference.

While some of Anoto's licensees have targeted the consumer sector, with, for example, learning toys, most licensees sell their products to providers who put together customized vertical market systems. Anoto also sells a software development kit (SDK), numerous software applications, and the Anoto Forms Solution (AFS). In addition, Anoto sells an ASIC design for the image processing component of the pen; most pen licensees use the same basic design of optical assembly and pen internals.

Simplified principle of the Anoto digital pen. The camera identifies a 6×6 matrix of dots, each displaced from the blue grid (not printed) in one of 4 directions. The combinations of relative displacements of a 6-bit de Bruijn sequence between the columns, and between the rows gives its absolute position on the digital paper.

Models include:

- Ericsson Chatpen CHA-30 (discontinued)
- Nokia SU-1B Digital Pen (discontinued)
- Nokia SU-27W (successor to SU-1B, rebranded Logitech io2)
- Logitech io2 Digital Pen
- Logitech io Digital Pen (earlier version, discontinued)
- Maxell Digital Pen (an earlier version might have been discontinued)
- Hewlett-Packard Digital Pen 200 (discontinued) (rebranded Logitech)
- Hewlett-Packard Digital Pen 250
- Fly (pentop computer)
- Tag (LeapFrog)
- Livescribe Pulse Smartpen
- Livescribe Echo Smartpen
- Livescribe Sky WiFi Smartpen
- Anoto Digital Pen DP-201 (Live pen 1)
- Anoto Digital Pen io2 Bluetooth
- Anoto Digital Pen DP-301
- Polyvision Digital Stylus (DP-301)
- Anoto Live pen 2
- Anoto Digital Pen AP-701
- Livescribe Aegir Smartpen
- Oxford Papershow

=== C.AI ===
Cognitive Artificial Intelligence is a cloud based AI program designed for offline education use. A digital pen aggregates and converts written analogue data on paper to digital data, and combined with a diagnostics assessment platform, enables an AI algorithm to recommend an individualized study plans.

=== aDNA ===
Anoto's dot pattern, when used with aDNA, allows for the unique and unobtrusive marking of physical objects. This then enables easy identification of individual objects using ubiquitous mobile devices such as phones and tablets. aDNA is opening up new possibilities for product innovation, marketing insights, and supply-chain control.

=== C-Pen ===
Anoto used to develop and sell the C-Pen, a one-line text scanner.

== Patents ==
Anoto holds more than 300 international patents on their technology and some 300 additional patent applications.

In 2004, Anoto prevailed in a patent infringement lawsuit filed by Oral Sekendur regarding Anoto's dot-pattern technology. The Sekendur patent was held invalid.

In 2019, Anoto secured summary judgement against City Soft Limited and one of its directors for infringing on Anoto's intellectual property.

== See also ==
- Digital pen
- Digital paper
- List of pen types, brands and companies
