= Digital paper =

Paper used to create digital documents

Simplified principle of the Anoto digital pen. The camera identifies a 6×6 matrix of dots, each displaced from the blue grid (not printed) in one of 4 directions. The combinations of relative displacements of a 6-bit de Bruijn sequence between the columns, and between the rows gives its absolute position on the digital paper.

Digital paper, also known as interactive paper, is patterned paper used in conjunction with a digital pen to create handwritten digital documents. The printed dot pattern identifies the position coordinates on the paper. The digital pen uses this pattern to store handwriting and upload it to a computer.

== The paper ==
The dot pattern is a two-dimensional barcode; the most common is the proprietary Anoto dot pattern. In the Anoto dot pattern, the paper is divided into a grid with a spacing of about 0.3 mm, a dot is printed near each intersection offset slightly in one of four directions, a camera in the pen typically records a 6 × 6 groups of dots. The full pattern is claimed to consist of 669,845,157,115,773,458,169 dots, and to encompass an area exceeding 4.6 million km² (this corresponds to 73 trillion unique sheets of letter-size paper).

The complete pattern space is divided into various domains. These domains can be used to define paper types, or to indicate the paper's purpose (for example, memo formatting, personal planners, notebook paper, Post-it notes, et cetera).

The Anoto dot pattern can be printed onto almost any paper, using a standard printing process of at least 600 dpi resolution (some claim a required resolution of 1,000 dpi), and carbon-based black ink. The paper can be any shape or size greater than 2 mm to a side. The ink absorbs infrared light transmitted from the digital pen; the pen contains a receiver that interprets the pattern of light reflected from the paper. Other colors of ink, including non-carbon-based black, can be used to print information that will be visible to the user, and invisible to the pen.

Standard black and white laser printers or color laser printers with a resolution of 600 dpi can be used to print the Anoto dot pattern. With a typical CMYK color laser printer, it's possible use full-color text and graphics that cover the entire page by avoiding using black (i.e., under color removal is turned off) and instead use only Cyan, Magenta, Yellow, or any combination -- which are ignored by the pen -- and using the black (K component) only for the Anoto pattern.

Standard black and white laser printers or color laser printers with a resolution of 600 dpi can be used to print the DataGlyph address carpet pattern. Redundant glyph marks support recovering the correct 2D location and angular orientation, even in the presence of overprinted text and line art.
