= Paul Ehrenfest =

Austrian theoretical physicist (1880–1933)

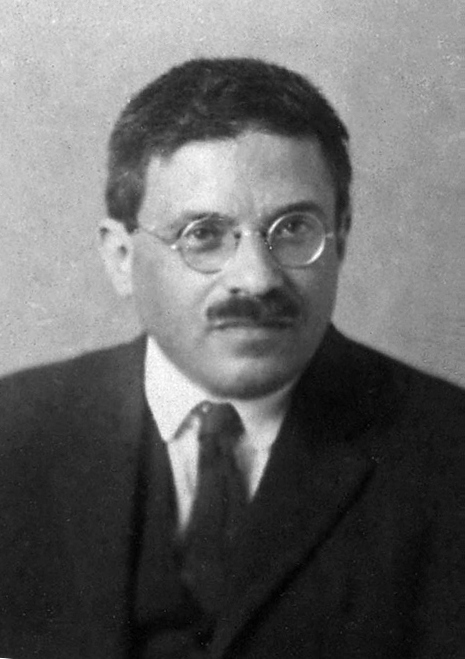
- Ehrenfest, c. 1910s
- Born: 18 January 1880; Vienna, Austria-Hungary
- Died: 25 September 1933 (aged 53); Amsterdam, Netherlands
- Cause of death: Murder–suicide
- Education: TU Wien; University of Göttingen; University of Vienna (PhD)
- Known for: Ehrenfest model (1907); Ehrenfest paradox (1909); Work on nonradiation condition (1910); Coining the term ultraviolet catastrophe (1911); Ehrenfest theorem (1927)
- Title: Professor of Theoretical Physics
- Term: 1912–1933
- Predecessor: Hendrik Lorentz
- Successor: Hans Kramers
- Spouse: Tatyana Afanasyeva (m. 1904)
- Children: 4, including Tatyana van Aardenne-Ehrenfest and Galinka Ehrenfest
- Scientific career
- Fields: Statistical physics
- Workplaces: Leiden University; Lorentz Institute
- Thesis: Die Bewegung starrer Körper in Flüssigkeiten und die Mechanik von Hertz (The motion of rigid bodies in fluids and the mechanics of Hertz) (1904)
- Doctoral advisor: Ludwig Boltzmann
- Doctoral students: Johannes Martinus Burgers (1918); Hendrik Kramers (1919); Dirk Coster (1922); Samuel Goudsmit (1927); George Uhlenbeck (1927); Jan Tinbergen (1929); Arend Joan Rutgers (1930); Hendrik Casimir (1931)
- Other notable students: Enrico Fermi; Viktor Trkal; Gerhard Heinrich Dieke

Paul Ehrenfest (Austrian German: [ˈpaʊl ˈeːrənfɛst]; 18 January 1880 – 25 September 1933) was an Austrian theoretical physicist who made major contributions to statistical mechanics and its relation to quantum mechanics, including the theory of phase transition and the Ehrenfest theorem. He befriended Albert Einstein on a visit to Prague in 1912 and became a professor in Leiden, where he frequently hosted Einstein. Suffering from depression, in 1933 Ehrenfest killed his disabled son, Wassik, and then himself.

== Biography ==
Paul Ehrenfest was born on 18 January 1880 in Vienna to Jewish parents, who were originally from Loštice in Moravia (now part of the Czech Republic). His parents, Sigmund Ehrenfest and Johanna Jellinek, managed a grocery store. Ehrenfest excelled in grade school but did not do well at the Akademisches Gymnasium, his best subject being mathematics. After transferring to the Franz Josef Gymnasium, his marks improved. In 1899, he passed the final exams.

He majored in chemistry at the Vienna Institute of Technology, but took courses at the University of Vienna, in particular from Ludwig Boltzmann on his kinetic theory of thermodynamics. These lectures had a profound influence: they were instrumental in developing Ehrenfest's interest in theoretical physics, defined his main area of research for years to come, and provided an example of inspired teaching. At the time, it was customary in the German-speaking world to study at more than one university, and in 1901, Ehrenfest transferred to University of Göttingen, which until 1933 was an important site for mathematics and theoretical physics. There he met his future wife, Tatyana Afanasyeva, a young mathematician born in Kiev (then the capital of the Kiev Governorate, Russian Empire) and educated in St Petersburg. In 1903, he met Dutch physicist Hendrik Lorentz during a short visit to Leiden, Netherlands. He wrote his dissertation on Die Bewegung starrer Körper in Flüssigkeiten und die Mechanik von Hertz (The Motion of Rigid Bodies in Fluids and the Mechanics of Hertz) and obtained his Ph.D. on 23 June 1904 in Vienna, where he stayed from 1904 to 1905.

On 21 December 1904, he married Afanasyeva, who collaborated with him in his work. They had two daughters and two sons: Tatyana ('Tanja') (1905–1984) also became a mathematician; Galinka ('Galja') (1910–1979) became an author and illustrator of children's books; Paul Jr. ('Pavlik') (1915–1939) became a physicist; and Vassily ('Wassik') (1918–1933).

The Ehrenfests returned to Göttingen in September 1906. They did not see Boltzmann again: on 5 September Boltzmann took his own life in Duino near Trieste. Ehrenfest published an extensive obituary describing Boltzmann's accomplishments. Felix Klein, dean of the Göttingen mathematicians and chief editor of the Enzyklopädie der mathematischen Wissenschaften ("Encyclopedia of Mathematical Sciences"), had counted on Boltzmann for a review about statistical mechanics. Now he asked Ehrenfest to take on this task. Together with his wife, Ehrenfest worked on it for several years; the article was not published until 1911. It is a review of the work of Boltzmann and his school, and has a style all its own: a sharp logical analysis of the fundamental hypotheses, clear delineation of unsolved questions, and an explanation of general principles by cleverly chosen transparent examples.

In 1907, the couple relocated to St. Petersburg. Ehrenfest found good friends there, in particular the physicist A.F. Joffe, but felt scientifically isolated. Moreover, because he was unwilling to declare belief in any religious denomination, he could not apply for a professorship and therefore had no prospect of securing a permanent position. In 1912, Ehrenfest toured German-speaking universities in the hope of a position. He visited Berlin, where he saw Max Planck; Leipzig, where he met his old friend German mathematician Gustav Herglotz; Munich, where he met theoretical physicist Arnold Sommerfeld; Zürich; and Vienna. In Prague he met Albert Einstein for the first time, and they remained close friends thereafter. Einstein recommended that Ehrenfest succeed him in his position in Prague, but the plan failed since Ehrenfest declared himself an atheist. Sommerfeld offered him a position in Munich, but Ehrenfest received a better offer; at the same time there was an unexpected turn of events: H. A. Lorentz resigned his position at the University of Leiden, and on his advice, Ehrenfest was appointed as his successor.

=== Academic career ===
In October 1912, Ehrenfest arrived in Leiden, and on 4 December, he gave his inaugural lecture, Zur Krise der Lichtaether-Hypothese (About the crisis of the light-ether hypothesis). He remained in Leiden for the rest of his career. To stimulate interaction and exchange among physics students, Ehrenfest organized a discussion group and a study association called De Leidsche Flesch ("The Leyden jar"). He maintained close contact with prominent physicists in the country and abroad, and invited them to visit Leiden and give presentations in his lecture series. Ehrenfest was an outstanding debater, quick to point out weaknesses and summarize the essentials.

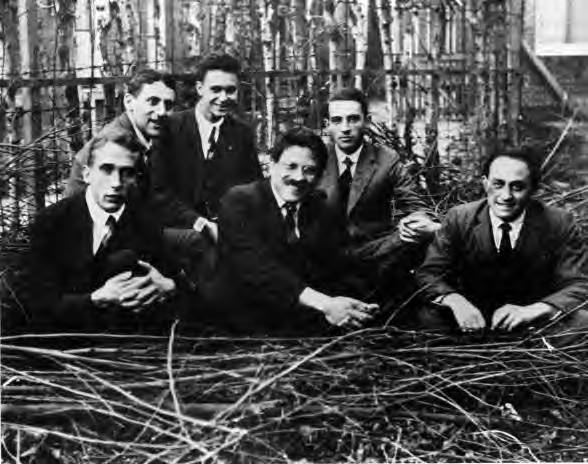
Ehrenfest's students, Leiden 1924. Left to right: Gerhard Heinrich Dieke, Samuel Abraham Goudsmit, Jan Tinbergen, Paul Ehrenfest, Ralph Kronig, and Enrico Fermi

In his lectures, Ehrenfest emphasized simple models and examples to illustrate and clarify basic assumptions. His classes were small, and he made an effort to get to know students who made use of the reading room. Though few of them were accepted as majors in theoretical physics, he had long discussions with them almost daily. According to Einstein:

He was not merely the best teacher in our profession whom I have ever known; he was also passionately preoccupied with the development and destiny of men, especially his students. To understand others, to gain their friendship and trust, to aid anyone embroiled in outer or inner struggles, to encourage youthful talent—all this was his real element, almost more than his immersion in scientific problems.

If Ehrenfest felt there was little more he could teach a student, he would send them to other centers in Europe for more training. He would also encourage students to accept positions abroad. Among his students were Johannes Burgers, Hendrik Kramers, Dirk Coster, George Uhlenbeck and Samuel Goudsmit, who became famous for jointly proposing the concept of electron spin, Jan Tinbergen, Arend Rutgers, Hendrik Casimir, Gerhard Dieke, Dirk Struik, and Gerard Kuiper. His assistants included Yuri Krutkov, Viktor Trkal, Adriaan Fokker, Paul Epstein, and Gregory Breit. Other young foreign scientists who spent extended periods in his laboratory included Gunnar Nordström, Enrico Fermi, Igor Tamm, Oskar Klein, J. Robert Oppenheimer, Walter Elsasser, Ralph Kronig, Werner Heisenberg, Paul Dirac, and David Dennison.

Ehrenfest had ambivalent opinions about science, technological progress, and cultural and social issues.

In 1919, he became a member of the Royal Netherlands Academy of Arts and Sciences.

=== Final years ===
Going by his correspondence with his friends, it seems that Ehrenfest suffered from severe depression at latest by May 1931. By August 1932, Einstein was so worried that he wrote to the Board of the University of Leiden, expressing concern and suggesting ways in which Ehrenfest's workload could be reduced.

Having made arrangements for the care of his other children, on 25 September 1933, in Amsterdam, Ehrenfest fatally shot his younger son Wassik, who had Down syndrome, then killed himself.

== Research ==
Most of Ehrenfest's scientific papers deal primarily with fundamentals, and seek to clarify single sub-topics. His publications are renowned for their lucidity and directness, and for solving paradoxes by providing clearer descriptions. His method is best illustrated by what he wrote to Robert Oppenheimer in the summer of 1928, after Oppenheimer invited himself for an extended stay in Leiden:

If you intend to mount heavy mathematical artillery again during your coming year in Europe, I would ask you not only not to come to Leiden, but if possible not even to Holland, and just because I am really so fond of you and want to keep it that way. But if, on the contrary, you want to spend at least your first few months patiently, comfortably, and joyfully in discussions that keep coming back to the same few points, chatting about a few basic questions with me and our young people—and without thinking much about publishing (!!!)—why then I welcome you with open arms!!

Characteristically, he did not like the abstraction of the new quantum theory of Heisenberg and Dirac.

Ehrenfest's most important contribution from 1912 to 1933 is the theory of adiabatic invariants. It is a concept derived from classical mechanics that can serve to refine certain methods of Niels Bohr's model of the atom (although initially Ehrenfest did not accept Bohr's ideas), and also creates an association between atomic mechanics and statistical mechanics. He made major contributions to quantum physics, including the theory of phase transitions and the Ehrenfest theorem, which states that expectation values of a quantum system conform to classical mechanics. His name is also given to the Ehrenfest paradox, an apparent paradox of relativity still discussed, to the Ehrenfest model, and to Ehrenfest time, the time characterizing the difference of quantum dynamics for observables from classical dynamics.

Ehrenfest was also interested in developing mathematical theories for economics. This interest was stimulated by his notion that there should be an analogy between thermodynamics and economic processes. While this did not result in publications, he did encourage his graduate student Jan Tinbergen to research this. Tinbergen's thesis was devoted to problems from both physics and economics, and he later became an economist and was awarded the first Nobel Memorial Prize in Economic Sciences in 1969.

== Einstein and Bohr in Leiden ==
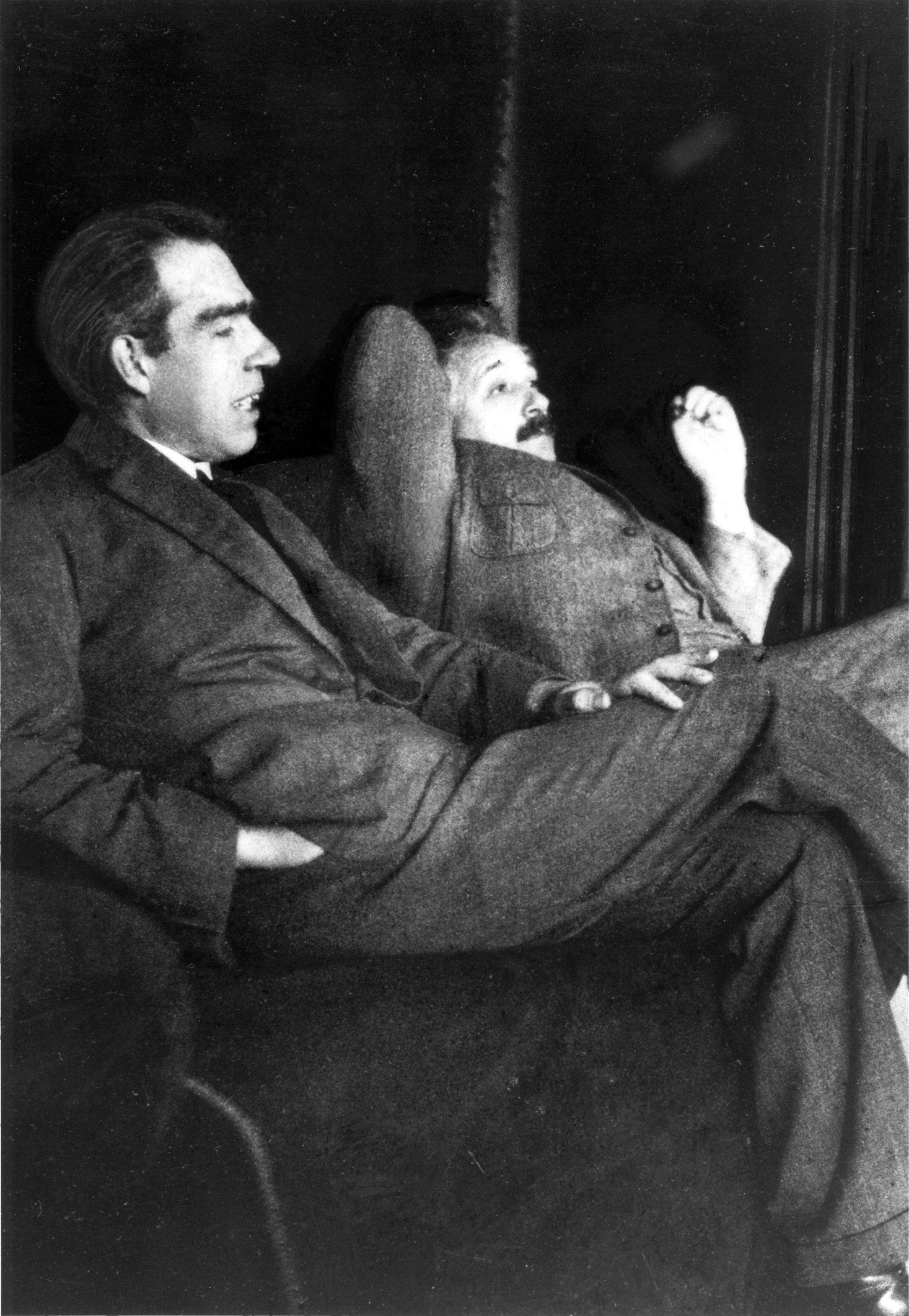
Niels Bohr and Albert Einstein debating quantum theory at Ehrenfest's home in Leiden (December 1925).

Ehrenfest was particularly close to both Einstein and Bohr. After Niels Bohr's first visit to Leiden in 1919, for Hans Kramers' thesis defense, he wrote to Ehrenfest:

I am sitting and thinking of all what you have told me about so very many different things, and whatever I think of I feel that I have learned so much from you which will be of great importance for me; but, at the same time, I wish so much to express my feeling of happiness over your friendship and of thankfulness for the confidence and sympathy you have shown me, I find myself so utterly incapable of finding words for it.

On his invitation Einstein accepted in 1920 an appointment as extraordinary professor at the University of Leiden. This arrangement allowed Einstein to visit Leiden for a few weeks every year. At these occasions Einstein would stay at Ehrenfest's home. In 1923 Einstein stayed there for six weeks, after German ultra-nationalists in Berlin had made threats against his life. On the occasion of the 50th anniversary of Lorentz' doctorate (December 1925) Ehrenfest invited both Bohr and Einstein over to Leiden, in an attempt to reconcile their scientific differences about the emerging quantum theory. These discussions were continued at the 1927 Solvay Conference, where Ehrenfest much to his dismay preferred Bohr's argument in this great debate.

== Quotes ==
Ehrenfest used colourful German language in his physics lectures:

Das ist der springende Punkt (translation: That is the crucial point)
Das ist wo der Frosch ins Wasser springt (That is where the frog jumps into the water)
Das ist der Patentanspruch (That is the patent claim, the essence)
Da hat Herr ... schliesslich die Ratte aus der Suppe gezogen (There Mr. X finally pulled the rat out of the soup) [when a scientist had solved a messy problem]
Je besser man's versteht um so besser steht es dort (The better one understands, the better it is written there) [Ehrenfest's comment when Dirac was asked in writing for an explanation of his work, and Dirac characteristically simply reproduced exactly his previous explanation]

== Legacy ==
The monthly evening colloquium in physics at Leiden University Ehrenfest initiated in 1912 at his house continues with the name Colloquium Ehrenfestii.

The Austrian Institute for Quantum Optics and Quantum Information sponsors the annual Paul Ehrenfest Best Paper Award for Quantum Foundations.

The Dutch Physics Council sponsors the annual Ehrenfest-Afanassjewa thesis award.

== In culture ==
A fictionalized account of Ehrenfest's life is the subject of the first section of Benjamín Labatut's 2023 novel The MANIAC.

== Bibliography ==
- H.B.G. Casimir: Haphazard Reality – Half a Century of Science. New York, Harper & Row, 1983.
- Martin J. Klein: Paul Ehrenfest: The Making of a Theoretical Physicist. Biography of Paul Ehrenfest. Amsterdam: Elsevier. ISBN 0-7204-0163-1. 1985 edition: ISBN 0-444-86948-4
