= Abram Ioffe =

Soviet physicist (1880–1960)

- Абрам Иоффе
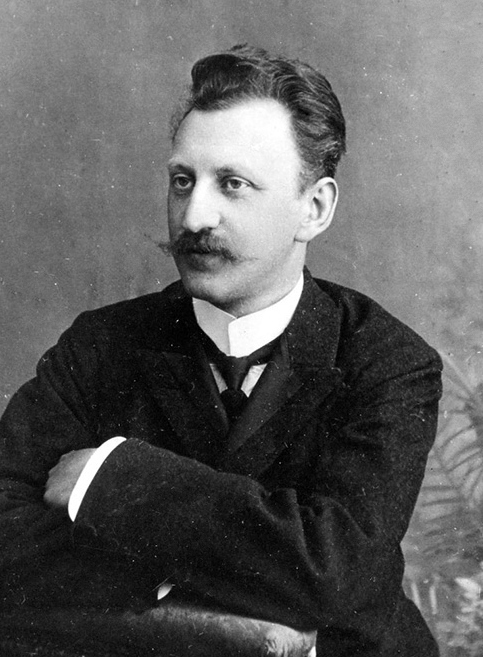
- Born: Abram Fedorovich Ioffe; 29 October 1880; Romny, Poltava Governorate, Russian Empire
- Died: 14 October 1960 (aged 79); Leningrad, Russian SFSR, Soviet Union
- Education: Saint Petersburg State Institute of Technology; Ludwig-Maximilians-Universität München (Dr. phil.)
- Awards: Stalin Prize (1942); Lenin Prize (1961); 3x Order of Lenin
- Scientific career
- Fields: Physics
- Workplaces: Saint Petersburg Polytechnical University; Leningrad Physico-Technical Institute; Academy of Sciences of the USSR
- Thesis: Elastische Nachwirkung im kristallinischen Quarz (1905)
- Doctoral advisor: Wilhelm Röntgen
- Notable students: Abram Alikhanov; Matvei Bronstein; Pyotr Kapitsa; Igor Kurchatov; Lev Landau; Pyotr Lukirsky; Nikolay Semyonov

Signature
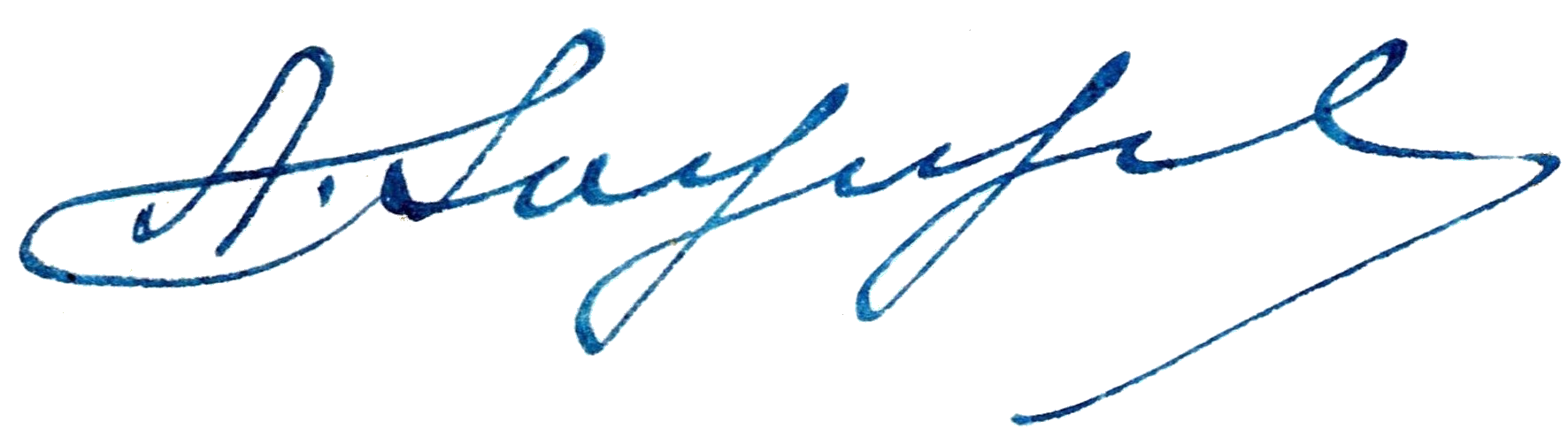

Abram Fedorovich (Note: Also transliterated Fyodorovich.) Ioffe (Russian: Абра́м Фёдорович Ио́ффе, IPA: [ɐˈbram ˈfʲɵdərəvʲɪtɕ ɪˈofɛ]; 29 October [O.S. 17 October] 1880 – 14 October 1960) was a Russian and Soviet physicist. He received the Stalin Prize (1942) and the Lenin Prize (1961) (posthumously). Ioffe was an expert in various areas of solid state physics and electromagnetism. He established research laboratories for radioactivity, superconductivity, and nuclear physics, many of which became independent institutes. He has been described as the "father of Soviet physics".

== Early life and education ==
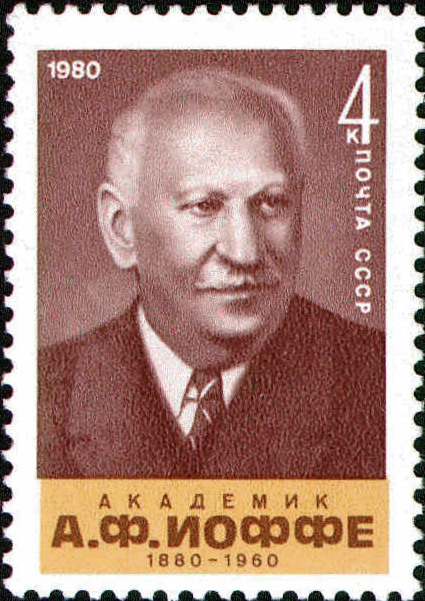
Ioffe on a 1980 Soviet stamp

Abram Fedorovich Ioffe was born on 29 October 1880 in Romny in the Russian Empire, into a middle-class Jewish family. After graduating from Saint Petersburg State Institute of Technology in 1902, he spent two years as an assistant to Wilhelm Röntgen at the Ludwig-Maximilians-Universität München. In 1905, he received his Ph.D. with a thesis on the electrical conductivity/electrical stress of dielectric crystals. He returned to Russia and explained to Röntgen:

I consider it my duty given the present sad and critical position in [Russia] to do all in my power (even if it is very little) in this bitter struggle [against political reaction], or at least not to turn aside from the dangers connected with it. I certainly do not want to become a "politician" – I have no predisposition for that, I can find satisfaction only in science.

== Career and research ==
After 1906, Ioffe worked at the Saint Petersburg Polytechnical University. In 1911, he (independently of Robert Millikan) determined the charge of an electron. In this experiment, the microparticles of zinc metal were irradiated with ultraviolet light to eject the electrons. The charged microparticles were then balanced in an electric field against gravity so that their charges could be determined (published in 1913).

Ioffe's career at first was negatively affected by his Jewish background, as well as the fact that the education system did not recognize his doctorate from Germany. In 1911, Ioffe converted from Judaism to Lutheranism and married a non-Jewish woman. However, he continued to pursue research and deliver lectures, and was soon able to start making an impact on Russian physics. He became close friends with Paul Ehrenfest, who resided in St. Petersburg from 1907 to 1912 and played a major role in bringing modern theoretical physics to Russia.

Ioffe's work soon received recognition. In 1913, he attained the title of Magister of Philosophy, and became a professor in the Saint Petersburg Polytechnical University. In 1915, he received the title of Doctor of Physics. The St. Petersburg Academy of Sciences also rewarded him a prize for his study on the magnetic field of cathode rays.

Following the Russian Revolution, like most Russian scientists, Ioffe welcomed the end of the monarchy, but viewed the Bolsheviks with caution. In 1918, he left for Crimea but soon returned "to tie his fate with the land of the Soviets". In September, he was one of the first scientists to express their support for the Bolsheviks. In November, he became an academician of the Academy of Sciences; by 1920, he was a full academician.

In 1918, he became head of the physics and technology division of the State Institute of Roentgenology and Radiology. This institute became the Leningrad Physico-Technical Institute (LPTI) in 1933, and eventually the Ioffe Institute.

In the early 1930s, there was a critical need in the Air Defense Forces of the Red Army for means of detecting invading aircraft. A number of research institutes were involved with radiolokatory (radio-location) techniques. The Russian Academy of Sciences called a conference in January 1934 to assess this technology. Ioffe organized this conference, then published a journal report, disclosing to researchers throughout the world the science and technology that would ultimately be called radar.

When the Soviet atomic bomb project began in 1942, Ioffe was asked to lead the technical effort, but refused the job on the grounds that he was too old. He saw great promise in the young Igor Kurchatov, and placed him in charge of the first nuclear laboratory. During Joseph Stalin's campaign against the so-called "rootless cosmopolitans" (Jews), in 1950 Ioffe was made redundant from his position of the Director of LPTI and from the board of directors. In 1952–1954 he headed the Laboratory of Semiconductors of Academy of Sciences of the USSR, which in 1954 was reorganized as the Institute of Semiconductors. Following Ioffe's death, in 1960 the LPTI was renamed the Ioffe Physico-Technical Institute and is one of Russia's leading research centers.

Ioffe's students include Aleksandr Aleksandrov, Pyotr Kapitsa, Pyotr Lukirsky, Isaak Kikoin, Igor Kurchatov, Yakov Frenkel, Nikolay Semyonov, Léon Theremin, Boris Davydov, and Lev Artsimovich. Ioffe asked Ernest Rutherford to accept Pyotr Kapitsa to Cavendish Laboratory at the University of Cambridge.

== Honors ==
- The lunar crater Ioffe is named after him.
- Ioffe Physico-Technical Institute carries his name.
- The Russian oceanographic and Polar research vessel Akademik Ioffe is named after him.
- The asteroid 5222 Ioffe is named after him.

== Patents ==
- U.S. patent 1,807,292 "Translating device"
- U.S. Patent on the piezoelectric effect

== Sources ==
- Cochran, Thomas B. (15 April 2019) [1995]. Making The Russian Bomb: From Stalin To Yeltsin. Routledge. ISBN 978-0-429-72058-1.
- Holloway, David (1 January 1994). Stalin and the Bomb: The Soviet Union and Atomic Energy, 1939-1956. Yale University Press. ISBN 978-0-300-06664-7.
