= List of minor planets: 832001–833000 =

The following is a partial list of minor planets, running from minor-planet number 832001 through 833000, inclusive. The primary data for this and other partial lists is based on JPL's "Small-Body Orbital Elements" and data available from the Minor Planet Center. Critical list information is also provided by the MPC, unless otherwise specified from Lowell Observatory. A detailed description of the table's columns and additional sources are given on the main page including a complete list of every page in this series, and a statistical break-up on the dynamical classification of minor planets.

Also see the summary list of all named bodies in numerical and alphabetical order, and the corresponding naming citations for the number range of this particular list. New namings may only be added to this list after official publication, as the preannouncement of names is condemned by the Working Group for Small Bodies Nomenclature of the International Astronomical Union.

Near-Earth obj.	MBA (inner)	MBA (outer)	Centaur
Mars-crosser	MBA (middle)	Jupiter trojan	Trans-Neptunian obj.
Unclassified

== 832001–832100 ==
Designation			Discovery			Properties		Ref
Permanent	Provisional	Named after	Date	Site	Discoverer(s)	Category	Diam.	Ref
832001	2010 AX_{114}	—	January 13, 2010	WISE	WISE	·	4.2 km	MPC · JPL
832002	2010 AZ_{116}	—	January 13, 2010	WISE	WISE	·	1.8 km	MPC · JPL
832003	2010 AH_{117}	—	January 13, 2010	WISE	WISE	L4	5.8 km	MPC · JPL
832004	2010 AM_{117}	—	September 23, 2009	Kitt Peak	Spacewatch	·	1.4 km	MPC · JPL
832005	2010 AO_{117}	—	January 13, 2010	WISE	WISE	·	1.8 km	MPC · JPL
832006	2010 AX_{118}	—	January 13, 2010	WISE	WISE	·	1.5 km	MPC · JPL
832007	2010 AC_{119}	—	January 13, 2010	WISE	WISE	·	2.6 km	MPC · JPL
832008	2010 AG_{119}	—	January 13, 2010	WISE	WISE	EUP	3.9 km	MPC · JPL
832009	2010 AX_{119}	—	October 2, 2009	Mount Lemmon	Mount Lemmon Survey	ADE	1.7 km	MPC · JPL
832010	2010 AK_{120}	—	January 14, 2010	WISE	WISE	·	4.4 km	MPC · JPL
832011	2010 AV_{120}	—	January 14, 2010	WISE	WISE	·	4.0 km	MPC · JPL
832012	2010 AZ_{120}	—	January 14, 2010	WISE	WISE	·	2.6 km	MPC · JPL
832013	2010 AU_{121}	—	January 14, 2010	WISE	WISE	L4	8.0 km	MPC · JPL
832014	2010 AY_{121}	—	November 24, 2008	Mount Lemmon	Mount Lemmon Survey	·	2.7 km	MPC · JPL
832015	2010 AZ_{121}	—	January 14, 2010	WISE	WISE	·	1.3 km	MPC · JPL
832016	2010 AG_{122}	—	January 14, 2010	WISE	WISE	·	560 m	MPC · JPL
832017	2010 AH_{122}	—	July 25, 2015	Haleakala	Pan-STARRS 1	KON	1.9 km	MPC · JPL
832018	2010 AF_{124}	—	September 16, 2009	Kitt Peak	Spacewatch	·	2.8 km	MPC · JPL
832019	2010 AL_{124}	—	January 14, 2010	WISE	WISE	·	3.0 km	MPC · JPL
832020	2010 AD_{125}	—	September 29, 2009	Mount Lemmon	Mount Lemmon Survey	LIX	3.9 km	MPC · JPL
832021	2010 AE_{125}	—	January 14, 2010	WISE	WISE	LUT	2.6 km	MPC · JPL
832022	2010 AO_{125}	—	October 2, 2009	Mount Lemmon	Mount Lemmon Survey	L4	8.7 km	MPC · JPL
832023	2010 AB_{126}	—	January 14, 2010	WISE	WISE	·	2.1 km	MPC · JPL
832024	2010 AD_{126}	—	April 6, 2010	Kitt Peak	Spacewatch	LUT	3.2 km	MPC · JPL
832025	2010 AK_{126}	—	December 7, 2013	Haleakala	Pan-STARRS 1	·	4.7 km	MPC · JPL
832026	2010 AP_{126}	—	January 14, 2010	WISE	WISE	·	2.2 km	MPC · JPL
832027	2010 AP_{127}	—	October 1, 2009	Mount Lemmon	Mount Lemmon Survey	·	2.6 km	MPC · JPL
832028	2010 AS_{127}	—	January 8, 2010	Mount Lemmon	Mount Lemmon Survey	T_{j} (2.97)	3.6 km	MPC · JPL
832029	2010 AR_{129}	—	March 14, 2010	Kitt Peak	Spacewatch	·	2.0 km	MPC · JPL
832030	2010 AK_{130}	—	January 14, 2010	WISE	WISE	L4	6.4 km	MPC · JPL
832031	2010 AZ_{130}	—	January 15, 2010	WISE	WISE	·	2.1 km	MPC · JPL
832032	2010 AO_{131}	—	January 15, 2010	WISE	WISE	·	1.7 km	MPC · JPL
832033	2010 AB_{132}	—	September 30, 2009	Mount Lemmon	Mount Lemmon Survey	·	1.7 km	MPC · JPL
832034	2010 AY_{132}	—	January 15, 2010	WISE	WISE	·	2.8 km	MPC · JPL
832035	2010 AB_{133}	—	January 15, 2010	WISE	WISE	·	2.2 km	MPC · JPL
832036	2010 AE_{133}	—	January 15, 2010	WISE	WISE	·	2.2 km	MPC · JPL
832037	2010 AO_{133}	—	January 15, 2010	WISE	WISE	·	2.2 km	MPC · JPL
832038	2010 AB_{134}	—	May 5, 2010	Mount Lemmon	Mount Lemmon Survey	·	2.3 km	MPC · JPL
832039	2010 AD_{134}	—	April 5, 2010	Kitt Peak	Spacewatch	·	2.2 km	MPC · JPL
832040	2010 AF_{134}	—	December 1, 2014	Haleakala	Pan-STARRS 1	·	2.6 km	MPC · JPL
832041	2010 AK_{134}	—	January 15, 2010	WISE	WISE	·	3.7 km	MPC · JPL
832042	2010 AL_{134}	—	January 15, 2010	WISE	WISE	·	2.2 km	MPC · JPL
832043	2010 AM_{134}	—	January 15, 2010	WISE	WISE	·	2.6 km	MPC · JPL
832044	2010 AP_{134}	—	January 15, 2010	WISE	WISE	·	4.7 km	MPC · JPL
832045	2010 AO_{136}	—	December 18, 2009	Mount Lemmon	Mount Lemmon Survey	·	3.1 km	MPC · JPL
832046	2010 AB_{137}	—	May 13, 2010	Mount Lemmon	Mount Lemmon Survey	·	2.2 km	MPC · JPL
832047	2010 AY_{137}	—	January 15, 2010	WISE	WISE	·	2.3 km	MPC · JPL
832048	2010 AN_{138}	—	January 15, 2010	WISE	WISE	·	3.5 km	MPC · JPL
832049	2010 AD_{139}	—	January 15, 2010	WISE	WISE	L4	6.4 km	MPC · JPL
832050	2010 AG_{142}	—	August 19, 2001	Cerro Tololo	Deep Ecliptic Survey	V	440 m	MPC · JPL
832051	2010 AB_{150}	—	July 4, 2010	WISE	WISE	·	1.3 km	MPC · JPL
832052	2010 AJ_{151}	—	June 29, 2010	WISE	WISE	·	3.3 km	MPC · JPL
832053	2010 AD_{152}	—	February 20, 2015	Haleakala	Pan-STARRS 1	·	1.8 km	MPC · JPL
832054	2010 AG_{154}	—	January 13, 2010	Mount Lemmon	Mount Lemmon Survey	·	3.1 km	MPC · JPL
832055	2010 AR_{154}	—	October 21, 2017	Mount Lemmon	Mount Lemmon Survey	·	1.4 km	MPC · JPL
832056	2010 AZ_{154}	—	September 6, 2013	Kitt Peak	Spacewatch	(1547)	1.6 km	MPC · JPL
832057	2010 AL_{155}	—	January 12, 2010	Mount Lemmon	Mount Lemmon Survey	·	2.9 km	MPC · JPL
832058	2010 AW_{155}	—	January 11, 2010	Kitt Peak	Spacewatch	·	1.1 km	MPC · JPL
832059	2010 AP_{156}	—	January 6, 2010	Mount Lemmon	Mount Lemmon Survey	PHO	1.0 km	MPC · JPL
832060	2010 AS_{156}	—	January 6, 2010	Mount Lemmon	Mount Lemmon Survey	·	2.6 km	MPC · JPL
832061	2010 AY_{157}	—	January 13, 2010	Mount Lemmon	Mount Lemmon Survey	·	2.4 km	MPC · JPL
832062	2010 AQ_{158}	—	January 11, 2010	Mount Lemmon	Mount Lemmon Survey	·	2.0 km	MPC · JPL
832063	2010 AU_{158}	—	January 8, 2010	Kitt Peak	Spacewatch	·	880 m	MPC · JPL
832064	2010 AR_{159}	—	January 11, 2010	Kitt Peak	Spacewatch	·	1.3 km	MPC · JPL
832065	2010 AZ_{159}	—	January 12, 2010	Kitt Peak	Spacewatch	·	610 m	MPC · JPL
832066	2010 AD_{160}	—	January 8, 2010	Mount Lemmon	Mount Lemmon Survey	EUP	3.2 km	MPC · JPL
832067	2010 AE_{160}	—	November 28, 2014	Haleakala	Pan-STARRS 1	EOS	1.3 km	MPC · JPL
832068	2010 AV_{161}	—	January 14, 2010	Mount Lemmon	Mount Lemmon Survey	·	1.8 km	MPC · JPL
832069	2010 AF_{162}	—	January 11, 2010	Kitt Peak	Spacewatch	·	490 m	MPC · JPL
832070	2010 AL_{162}	—	January 8, 2010	Kitt Peak	Spacewatch	·	1.5 km	MPC · JPL
832071	2010 AS_{164}	—	June 1, 2010	WISE	WISE	·	3.3 km	MPC · JPL
832072	2010 AN_{167}	—	September 21, 2012	Mount Lemmon	Mount Lemmon Survey	·	880 m	MPC · JPL
832073	2010 BL_{1}	—	January 6, 2010	Mount Lemmon	Mount Lemmon Survey	LUT	3.4 km	MPC · JPL
832074	2010 BQ_{1}	—	January 18, 2010	Dauban	C. Rinner, Kugel, F.	·	1.3 km	MPC · JPL
832075	2010 BR_{6}	—	January 16, 2010	WISE	WISE	·	3.6 km	MPC · JPL
832076	2010 BP_{7}	—	January 16, 2010	WISE	WISE	·	3.1 km	MPC · JPL
832077	2010 BX_{7}	—	September 17, 2012	Mount Lemmon	Mount Lemmon Survey	·	2.3 km	MPC · JPL
832078	2010 BA_{8}	—	January 16, 2010	WISE	WISE	·	1.7 km	MPC · JPL
832079	2010 BC_{8}	—	January 16, 2010	WISE	WISE	·	1.4 km	MPC · JPL
832080	2010 BK_{8}	—	September 27, 2009	Mount Lemmon	Mount Lemmon Survey	·	2.7 km	MPC · JPL
832081	2010 BE_{9}	—	November 1, 2008	Mount Lemmon	Mount Lemmon Survey	·	2.9 km	MPC · JPL
832082	2010 BF_{9}	—	January 16, 2010	WISE	WISE	·	3.2 km	MPC · JPL
832083	2010 BR_{9}	—	October 25, 2009	Mount Lemmon	Mount Lemmon Survey	·	2.2 km	MPC · JPL
832084	2010 BD_{10}	—	January 16, 2010	WISE	WISE	·	2.6 km	MPC · JPL
832085	2010 BT_{10}	—	October 25, 2009	Mount Lemmon	Mount Lemmon Survey	·	3.1 km	MPC · JPL
832086	2010 BW_{10}	—	January 16, 2010	WISE	WISE	·	3.0 km	MPC · JPL
832087	2010 BB_{11}	—	January 16, 2010	WISE	WISE	·	990 m	MPC · JPL
832088	2010 BL_{12}	—	January 16, 2010	WISE	WISE	·	2.8 km	MPC · JPL
832089	2010 BW_{12}	—	January 16, 2010	WISE	WISE	·	2.3 km	MPC · JPL
832090	2010 BF_{14}	—	January 16, 2010	WISE	WISE	·	1.9 km	MPC · JPL
832091	2010 BJ_{14}	—	January 16, 2010	WISE	WISE	·	1.7 km	MPC · JPL
832092	2010 BN_{14}	—	January 16, 2010	WISE	WISE	·	2.6 km	MPC · JPL
832093	2010 BW_{14}	—	January 16, 2010	WISE	WISE	·	2.2 km	MPC · JPL
832094	2010 BX_{14}	—	January 16, 2010	WISE	WISE	3:2	4.7 km	MPC · JPL
832095	2010 BH_{15}	—	September 20, 2009	Kitt Peak	Spacewatch	DOR	1.5 km	MPC · JPL
832096	2010 BU_{15}	—	January 16, 2010	WISE	WISE	EUP	3.6 km	MPC · JPL
832097	2010 BC_{16}	—	January 16, 2010	WISE	WISE	·	3.2 km	MPC · JPL
832098	2010 BJ_{16}	—	September 27, 2009	Mount Lemmon	Mount Lemmon Survey	L4	9.0 km	MPC · JPL
832099	2010 BW_{16}	—	January 16, 2010	WISE	WISE	·	950 m	MPC · JPL
832100	2010 BG_{17}	—	January 17, 2010	WISE	WISE	3:2 · SHU	4.3 km	MPC · JPL

== 832101–832200 ==
back to top

Designation			Discovery			Properties		Ref
Permanent	Provisional	Named after	Date	Site	Discoverer(s)	Category	Diam.	Ref
832101	2010 BM_{17}	—	January 17, 2010	WISE	WISE	·	1.9 km	MPC · JPL
832102	2010 BW_{17}	—	October 17, 2009	Catalina	CSS	·	2.8 km	MPC · JPL
832103	2010 BB_{19}	—	October 25, 2009	Kitt Peak	Spacewatch	PHO	2.4 km	MPC · JPL
832104	2010 BO_{20}	—	May 13, 2010	Mount Lemmon	Mount Lemmon Survey	·	2.4 km	MPC · JPL
832105	2010 BG_{21}	—	September 27, 2009	Mount Lemmon	Mount Lemmon Survey	·	2.2 km	MPC · JPL
832106	2010 BO_{21}	—	January 17, 2010	WISE	WISE	·	2.3 km	MPC · JPL
832107	2010 BB_{22}	—	March 20, 2010	Kitt Peak	Spacewatch	3:2 · SHU	4.5 km	MPC · JPL
832108	2010 BX_{22}	—	April 5, 2002	Palomar	NEAT	DOR	2.7 km	MPC · JPL
832109	2010 BR_{23}	—	January 17, 2010	WISE	WISE	·	2.4 km	MPC · JPL
832110	2010 BW_{24}	—	January 17, 2010	WISE	WISE	·	2.1 km	MPC · JPL
832111	2010 BZ_{24}	—	January 17, 2010	WISE	WISE	·	1.7 km	MPC · JPL
832112	2010 BB_{26}	—	January 17, 2010	WISE	WISE	·	1.0 km	MPC · JPL
832113	2010 BM_{28}	—	April 20, 2010	Mount Lemmon	Mount Lemmon Survey	·	3.6 km	MPC · JPL
832114	2010 BH_{30}	—	January 18, 2010	WISE	WISE	·	2.4 km	MPC · JPL
832115	2010 BQ_{30}	—	November 19, 2009	Mount Lemmon	Mount Lemmon Survey	·	2.5 km	MPC · JPL
832116	2010 BR_{30}	—	October 22, 2009	Mount Lemmon	Mount Lemmon Survey	·	2.4 km	MPC · JPL
832117	2010 BF_{31}	—	May 20, 2010	Mount Lemmon	Mount Lemmon Survey	·	3.1 km	MPC · JPL
832118	2010 BR_{31}	—	October 26, 2009	Mount Lemmon	Mount Lemmon Survey	·	2.2 km	MPC · JPL
832119	2010 BU_{31}	—	October 26, 2009	Catalina	CSS	THB	2.5 km	MPC · JPL
832120	2010 BU_{32}	—	January 18, 2010	WISE	WISE	·	2.4 km	MPC · JPL
832121	2010 BN_{33}	—	October 2, 2009	Mount Lemmon	Mount Lemmon Survey	LIX	2.9 km	MPC · JPL
832122	2010 BU_{33}	—	January 18, 2010	WISE	WISE	·	2.5 km	MPC · JPL
832123	2010 BB_{34}	—	January 18, 2010	WISE	WISE	·	3.6 km	MPC · JPL
832124	2010 BP_{34}	—	April 9, 2010	Mount Lemmon	Mount Lemmon Survey	·	620 m	MPC · JPL
832125	2010 BS_{36}	—	January 18, 2010	WISE	WISE	·	2.7 km	MPC · JPL
832126	2010 BX_{36}	—	January 18, 2010	WISE	WISE	T_{j} (2.98)	3.6 km	MPC · JPL
832127	2010 BY_{36}	—	January 18, 2010	WISE	WISE	·	1.8 km	MPC · JPL
832128	2010 BV_{37}	—	January 18, 2010	WISE	WISE	NAE	3.2 km	MPC · JPL
832129	2010 BB_{38}	—	October 2, 2009	Mount Lemmon	Mount Lemmon Survey	T_{j} (2.98)	3.7 km	MPC · JPL
832130	2010 BF_{38}	—	January 18, 2010	WISE	WISE	·	1.5 km	MPC · JPL
832131	2010 BP_{38}	—	May 10, 2010	Mount Lemmon	Mount Lemmon Survey	EUP	2.6 km	MPC · JPL
832132	2010 BS_{38}	—	January 19, 2010	WISE	WISE	·	2.1 km	MPC · JPL
832133	2010 BZ_{38}	—	January 19, 2010	WISE	WISE	·	3.1 km	MPC · JPL
832134	2010 BB_{39}	—	January 19, 2010	WISE	WISE	PHO	2.6 km	MPC · JPL
832135	2010 BB_{42}	—	January 19, 2010	WISE	WISE	·	2.1 km	MPC · JPL
832136	2010 BM_{42}	—	January 19, 2010	WISE	WISE	T_{j} (2.99) · EUP	3.4 km	MPC · JPL
832137	2010 BP_{42}	—	February 19, 2015	Haleakala	Pan-STARRS 1	·	3.1 km	MPC · JPL
832138	2010 BZ_{42}	—	October 1, 2009	Mount Lemmon	Mount Lemmon Survey	L4	9.8 km	MPC · JPL
832139	2010 BL_{43}	—	January 19, 2010	WISE	WISE	EUP	4.4 km	MPC · JPL
832140	2010 BO_{43}	—	January 19, 2010	WISE	WISE	·	2.6 km	MPC · JPL
832141	2010 BT_{43}	—	May 5, 2010	Mount Lemmon	Mount Lemmon Survey	·	3.2 km	MPC · JPL
832142	2010 BE_{44}	—	January 19, 2010	WISE	WISE	(5651)	2.1 km	MPC · JPL
832143	2010 BQ_{44}	—	November 19, 2009	Mount Lemmon	Mount Lemmon Survey	·	1.5 km	MPC · JPL
832144	2010 BA_{45}	—	January 19, 2010	WISE	WISE	·	3.1 km	MPC · JPL
832145	2010 BM_{45}	—	January 19, 2010	WISE	WISE	·	3.0 km	MPC · JPL
832146	2010 BX_{45}	—	October 2, 2009	Mount Lemmon	Mount Lemmon Survey	·	1.4 km	MPC · JPL
832147	2010 BZ_{45}	—	September 20, 2009	Mount Lemmon	Mount Lemmon Survey	·	2.0 km	MPC · JPL
832148	2010 BC_{46}	—	January 19, 2010	WISE	WISE	·	730 m	MPC · JPL
832149	2010 BR_{47}	—	October 27, 2005	Kitt Peak	Spacewatch	·	2.1 km	MPC · JPL
832150	2010 BZ_{47}	—	January 20, 2010	WISE	WISE	T_{j} (2.98)	4.1 km	MPC · JPL
832151	2010 BH_{48}	—	January 20, 2010	WISE	WISE	·	3.4 km	MPC · JPL
832152	2010 BT_{48}	—	October 18, 2014	Kitt Peak	Spacewatch	·	2.8 km	MPC · JPL
832153	2010 BX_{48}	—	January 20, 2010	WISE	WISE	·	1.7 km	MPC · JPL
832154	2010 BD_{49}	—	January 20, 2010	WISE	WISE	PHO	1.1 km	MPC · JPL
832155	2010 BG_{49}	—	January 20, 2010	WISE	WISE	·	2.2 km	MPC · JPL
832156	2010 BS_{49}	—	October 24, 2009	Kitt Peak	Spacewatch	·	2.0 km	MPC · JPL
832157	2010 BT_{49}	—	January 20, 2010	WISE	WISE	LIX	2.8 km	MPC · JPL
832158	2010 BD_{53}	—	April 13, 2010	Mount Lemmon	Mount Lemmon Survey	·	2.4 km	MPC · JPL
832159	2010 BF_{53}	—	January 20, 2010	WISE	WISE	·	2.2 km	MPC · JPL
832160	2010 BT_{53}	—	January 20, 2010	WISE	WISE	·	2.5 km	MPC · JPL
832161	2010 BY_{53}	—	January 20, 2010	WISE	WISE	KON	1.9 km	MPC · JPL
832162	2010 BK_{54}	—	January 20, 2010	WISE	WISE	·	1.8 km	MPC · JPL
832163	2010 BO_{54}	—	April 9, 2010	Mount Lemmon	Mount Lemmon Survey	·	1.9 km	MPC · JPL
832164	2010 BP_{54}	—	January 20, 2010	WISE	WISE	KON	2.2 km	MPC · JPL
832165	2010 BG_{55}	—	October 26, 2009	Mount Lemmon	Mount Lemmon Survey	L4	5.0 km	MPC · JPL
832166	2010 BQ_{55}	—	April 10, 2010	Kitt Peak	Spacewatch	DOR	2.1 km	MPC · JPL
832167	2010 BV_{55}	—	January 20, 2010	WISE	WISE	·	1.8 km	MPC · JPL
832168	2010 BA_{58}	—	January 21, 2010	WISE	WISE	·	3.1 km	MPC · JPL
832169	2010 BM_{58}	—	January 21, 2010	WISE	WISE	·	2.8 km	MPC · JPL
832170	2010 BR_{58}	—	January 21, 2010	WISE	WISE	·	2.6 km	MPC · JPL
832171	2010 BT_{58}	—	January 21, 2010	WISE	WISE	·	3.0 km	MPC · JPL
832172	2010 BT_{59}	—	October 27, 2009	Mount Lemmon	Mount Lemmon Survey	·	2.7 km	MPC · JPL
832173	2010 BM_{60}	—	January 21, 2010	WISE	WISE	·	1.9 km	MPC · JPL
832174	2010 BE_{61}	—	April 11, 2010	Kitt Peak	Spacewatch	·	3.3 km	MPC · JPL
832175	2010 BO_{62}	—	January 21, 2010	WISE	WISE	·	2.5 km	MPC · JPL
832176	2010 BR_{62}	—	January 21, 2010	WISE	WISE	·	2.6 km	MPC · JPL
832177	2010 BS_{63}	—	April 13, 2010	Mount Lemmon	Mount Lemmon Survey	·	2.8 km	MPC · JPL
832178	2010 BT_{63}	—	January 21, 2010	WISE	WISE	·	1.2 km	MPC · JPL
832179	2010 BB_{64}	—	January 21, 2010	WISE	WISE	·	3.9 km	MPC · JPL
832180	2010 BQ_{64}	—	November 8, 2009	Catalina	CSS	EUP	2.4 km	MPC · JPL
832181	2010 BQ_{66}	—	March 20, 1999	Sacramento Peak	SDSS	BRU	2.4 km	MPC · JPL
832182	2010 BA_{67}	—	January 22, 2010	WISE	WISE	EUP	2.5 km	MPC · JPL
832183	2010 BS_{68}	—	January 22, 2010	WISE	WISE	(895)	3.1 km	MPC · JPL
832184	2010 BX_{68}	—	December 29, 2008	Mount Lemmon	Mount Lemmon Survey	·	1.7 km	MPC · JPL
832185	2010 BD_{69}	—	January 22, 2010	WISE	WISE	·	3.2 km	MPC · JPL
832186	2010 BO_{69}	—	October 25, 2008	Mount Lemmon	Mount Lemmon Survey	KON	2.8 km	MPC · JPL
832187	2010 BL_{70}	—	May 13, 2010	Mount Lemmon	Mount Lemmon Survey	·	2.6 km	MPC · JPL
832188	2010 BT_{70}	—	January 22, 2010	WISE	WISE	EUP	3.8 km	MPC · JPL
832189	2010 BZ_{70}	—	January 22, 2010	WISE	WISE	·	2.3 km	MPC · JPL
832190	2010 BM_{71}	—	January 22, 2010	WISE	WISE	·	3.0 km	MPC · JPL
832191	2010 BX_{71}	—	April 10, 2010	Kitt Peak	Spacewatch	·	1.8 km	MPC · JPL
832192	2010 BZ_{71}	—	January 23, 2010	WISE	WISE	·	1.2 km	MPC · JPL
832193	2010 BC_{72}	—	January 23, 2010	WISE	WISE	LIX	2.9 km	MPC · JPL
832194	2010 BL_{73}	—	July 26, 2010	WISE	WISE	·	2.2 km	MPC · JPL
832195	2010 BZ_{73}	—	June 14, 2005	Mount Lemmon	Mount Lemmon Survey	·	2.7 km	MPC · JPL
832196	2010 BK_{74}	—	April 10, 2010	Mount Lemmon	Mount Lemmon Survey	·	2.9 km	MPC · JPL
832197	2010 BO_{74}	—	March 16, 2004	Sacramento Peak	SDSS	·	2.9 km	MPC · JPL
832198	2010 BY_{74}	—	January 23, 2010	WISE	WISE	·	2.0 km	MPC · JPL
832199	2010 BE_{75}	—	January 23, 2010	WISE	WISE	THB	2.4 km	MPC · JPL
832200	2010 BA_{76}	—	January 24, 2010	WISE	WISE	·	4.9 km	MPC · JPL

== 832201–832300 ==
back to top

Designation			Discovery			Properties		Ref
Permanent	Provisional	Named after	Date	Site	Discoverer(s)	Category	Diam.	Ref
832201	2010 BE_{77}	—	January 24, 2010	WISE	WISE	ADE	1.6 km	MPC · JPL
832202	2010 BF_{78}	—	January 24, 2010	WISE	WISE	·	2.7 km	MPC · JPL
832203	2010 BK_{78}	—	January 24, 2010	WISE	WISE	PHO	2.1 km	MPC · JPL
832204	2010 BZ_{78}	—	April 14, 2010	Mount Lemmon	Mount Lemmon Survey	LIX	3.8 km	MPC · JPL
832205	2010 BK_{79}	—	January 25, 2010	WISE	WISE	·	1.9 km	MPC · JPL
832206	2010 BF_{80}	—	January 25, 2010	WISE	WISE	·	2.9 km	MPC · JPL
832207	2010 BZ_{80}	—	January 25, 2010	WISE	WISE	·	3.9 km	MPC · JPL
832208	2010 BA_{82}	—	January 25, 2010	WISE	WISE	·	2.4 km	MPC · JPL
832209	2010 BB_{82}	—	January 25, 2010	WISE	WISE	THB	2.0 km	MPC · JPL
832210	2010 BG_{83}	—	January 25, 2010	WISE	WISE	·	2.8 km	MPC · JPL
832211	2010 BX_{83}	—	January 25, 2010	WISE	WISE	·	2.1 km	MPC · JPL
832212	2010 BX_{85}	—	January 26, 2010	WISE	WISE	·	2.1 km	MPC · JPL
832213	2010 BE_{86}	—	October 24, 2009	Mount Lemmon	Mount Lemmon Survey	·	2.1 km	MPC · JPL
832214	2010 BQ_{86}	—	April 26, 2010	Mount Lemmon	Mount Lemmon Survey	ADE	2.2 km	MPC · JPL
832215	2010 BS_{86}	—	January 26, 2010	WISE	WISE	EUP	2.8 km	MPC · JPL
832216	2010 BF_{87}	—	January 26, 2010	WISE	WISE	T_{j} (2.97) · 3:2	5.1 km	MPC · JPL
832217	2010 BY_{88}	—	January 26, 2010	WISE	WISE	·	3.6 km	MPC · JPL
832218	2010 BQ_{91}	—	January 26, 2010	WISE	WISE	LUT	2.9 km	MPC · JPL
832219	2010 BL_{92}	—	January 26, 2010	WISE	WISE	·	2.7 km	MPC · JPL
832220	2010 BW_{94}	—	January 27, 2010	WISE	WISE	·	3.3 km	MPC · JPL
832221	2010 BG_{95}	—	December 3, 2015	Haleakala	Pan-STARRS 1	·	2.2 km	MPC · JPL
832222	2010 BV_{95}	—	January 27, 2010	WISE	WISE	·	2.2 km	MPC · JPL
832223	2010 BZ_{96}	—	January 27, 2010	WISE	WISE	·	3.1 km	MPC · JPL
832224	2010 BJ_{98}	—	December 18, 2009	Kitt Peak	Spacewatch	EUN	3.3 km	MPC · JPL
832225	2010 BS_{98}	—	January 27, 2010	WISE	WISE	(194)	1.3 km	MPC · JPL
832226	2010 BV_{100}	—	January 27, 2010	WISE	WISE	·	2.5 km	MPC · JPL
832227	2010 BE_{101}	—	April 20, 2010	Mount Lemmon	Mount Lemmon Survey	·	1.8 km	MPC · JPL
832228	2010 BJ_{101}	—	January 27, 2010	WISE	WISE	·	2.6 km	MPC · JPL
832229	2010 BK_{101}	—	January 27, 2010	WISE	WISE	L4	12 km	MPC · JPL
832230	2010 BM_{101}	—	January 27, 2010	WISE	WISE	T_{j} (2.98)	2.8 km	MPC · JPL
832231	2010 BE_{102}	—	January 27, 2010	WISE	WISE	·	2.5 km	MPC · JPL
832232	2010 BT_{102}	—	September 18, 2003	Kitt Peak	Spacewatch	LIX	3.8 km	MPC · JPL
832233	2010 BC_{103}	—	September 22, 2009	Mount Lemmon	Mount Lemmon Survey	LIX	2.4 km	MPC · JPL
832234	2010 BE_{103}	—	November 11, 2009	Mount Lemmon	Mount Lemmon Survey	·	2.2 km	MPC · JPL
832235	2010 BJ_{105}	—	January 28, 2010	WISE	WISE	·	3.8 km	MPC · JPL
832236	2010 BM_{105}	—	September 19, 2000	Kitt Peak	Deep Ecliptic Survey	T_{j} (2.94)	5.1 km	MPC · JPL
832237	2010 BT_{105}	—	November 9, 2009	Catalina	CSS	·	3.0 km	MPC · JPL
832238	2010 BH_{106}	—	January 28, 2010	WISE	WISE	·	2.6 km	MPC · JPL
832239	2010 BB_{107}	—	January 28, 2010	WISE	WISE	EUP	3.0 km	MPC · JPL
832240	2010 BH_{107}	—	January 28, 2010	WISE	WISE	·	2.6 km	MPC · JPL
832241	2010 BO_{107}	—	October 23, 2009	Kitt Peak	Spacewatch	·	1.8 km	MPC · JPL
832242	2010 BA_{108}	—	January 28, 2010	WISE	WISE	·	3.0 km	MPC · JPL
832243	2010 BK_{108}	—	November 9, 2009	Mount Bigelow	CSS	ULA	3.2 km	MPC · JPL
832244	2010 BN_{108}	—	November 26, 2009	Mount Lemmon	Mount Lemmon Survey	·	1.3 km	MPC · JPL
832245	2010 BP_{108}	—	November 23, 2009	Catalina	CSS	PHO	1.7 km	MPC · JPL
832246	2010 BU_{108}	—	January 28, 2010	WISE	WISE	·	1.6 km	MPC · JPL
832247	2010 BM_{109}	—	September 30, 2003	Sacramento Peak	SDSS	·	3.1 km	MPC · JPL
832248	2010 BT_{109}	—	January 28, 2010	WISE	WISE	·	1.2 km	MPC · JPL
832249	2010 BY_{109}	—	September 11, 2009	Siding Spring	SSS	·	2.6 km	MPC · JPL
832250	2010 BA_{110}	—	January 29, 2010	WISE	WISE	·	4.4 km	MPC · JPL
832251	2010 BF_{110}	—	October 17, 2009	Kitt Peak	Spacewatch	·	1.5 km	MPC · JPL
832252	2010 BK_{110}	—	January 29, 2010	WISE	WISE	EUP	2.9 km	MPC · JPL
832253	2010 BQ_{110}	—	January 29, 2010	WISE	WISE	LIX	2.5 km	MPC · JPL
832254	2010 BX_{110}	—	January 29, 2010	WISE	WISE	·	2.1 km	MPC · JPL
832255	2010 BK_{111}	—	January 29, 2010	WISE	WISE	ELF	3.8 km	MPC · JPL
832256	2010 BM_{112}	—	January 29, 2010	WISE	WISE	·	2.3 km	MPC · JPL
832257	2010 BT_{112}	—	January 29, 2010	WISE	WISE	·	2.4 km	MPC · JPL
832258	2010 BX_{112}	—	October 12, 2009	Mount Lemmon	Mount Lemmon Survey	·	1.9 km	MPC · JPL
832259	2010 BH_{113}	—	August 8, 2010	WISE	WISE	·	1.3 km	MPC · JPL
832260	2010 BP_{113}	—	January 29, 2010	WISE	WISE	PHO	2.4 km	MPC · JPL
832261	2010 BQ_{113}	—	January 29, 2010	WISE	WISE	·	1.2 km	MPC · JPL
832262	2010 BR_{113}	—	January 29, 2010	WISE	WISE	·	3.0 km	MPC · JPL
832263	2010 BY_{113}	—	January 29, 2010	WISE	WISE	·	1.1 km	MPC · JPL
832264	2010 BC_{114}	—	January 29, 2010	WISE	WISE	·	1.4 km	MPC · JPL
832265	2010 BF_{114}	—	August 1, 2010	WISE	WISE	KON	2.4 km	MPC · JPL
832266	2010 BH_{114}	—	August 4, 2010	WISE	WISE	·	1.3 km	MPC · JPL
832267	2010 BN_{114}	—	October 16, 2009	Kitt Peak	Spacewatch	·	1.6 km	MPC · JPL
832268	2010 BV_{114}	—	November 8, 2009	Catalina	CSS	DOR	2.1 km	MPC · JPL
832269	2010 BZ_{114}	—	January 29, 2010	WISE	WISE	LIX	2.3 km	MPC · JPL
832270	2010 BT_{116}	—	January 29, 2010	WISE	WISE	·	2.6 km	MPC · JPL
832271	2010 BX_{116}	—	January 6, 2010	Mount Lemmon	Mount Lemmon Survey	·	3.3 km	MPC · JPL
832272	2010 BK_{117}	—	January 30, 2010	WISE	WISE	·	3.0 km	MPC · JPL
832273	2010 BQ_{117}	—	January 30, 2010	WISE	WISE	·	3.5 km	MPC · JPL
832274	2010 BR_{117}	—	November 17, 2009	Catalina	CSS	·	3.5 km	MPC · JPL
832275	2010 BO_{118}	—	July 28, 2010	WISE	WISE	·	3.1 km	MPC · JPL
832276	2010 BE_{119}	—	January 31, 2017	Mount Lemmon	Mount Lemmon Survey	·	3.1 km	MPC · JPL
832277	2010 BO_{119}	—	November 10, 2009	Mount Lemmon	Mount Lemmon Survey	·	3.1 km	MPC · JPL
832278	2010 BR_{120}	—	January 30, 2010	WISE	WISE	·	1.9 km	MPC · JPL
832279	2010 BT_{120}	—	January 30, 2010	WISE	WISE	·	1.5 km	MPC · JPL
832280	2010 BU_{120}	—	January 30, 2010	WISE	WISE	·	1.9 km	MPC · JPL
832281	2010 BA_{121}	—	January 30, 2010	WISE	WISE	·	1.5 km	MPC · JPL
832282	2010 BH_{121}	—	August 1, 2010	WISE	WISE	·	2.8 km	MPC · JPL
832283	2010 BW_{122}	—	February 6, 2010	Kitt Peak	Spacewatch	·	2.7 km	MPC · JPL
832284	2010 BP_{123}	—	January 17, 2016	Haleakala	Pan-STARRS 1	·	1.9 km	MPC · JPL
832285	2010 BN_{124}	—	October 14, 2009	Mount Lemmon	Mount Lemmon Survey	EMA	3.0 km	MPC · JPL
832286	2010 BY_{124}	—	April 15, 2010	Mount Lemmon	Mount Lemmon Survey	·	3.0 km	MPC · JPL
832287	2010 BS_{125}	—	January 31, 2010	WISE	WISE	·	2.9 km	MPC · JPL
832288	2010 BY_{125}	—	April 9, 2010	Kitt Peak	Spacewatch	·	1.6 km	MPC · JPL
832289	2010 BD_{126}	—	January 31, 2010	WISE	WISE	PHO	1.7 km	MPC · JPL
832290	2010 BG_{126}	—	September 29, 2009	Mount Lemmon	Mount Lemmon Survey	·	2.3 km	MPC · JPL
832291	2010 BJ_{126}	—	September 29, 2009	Mount Lemmon	Mount Lemmon Survey	·	3.2 km	MPC · JPL
832292	2010 BR_{127}	—	January 31, 2010	WISE	WISE	EUP	2.7 km	MPC · JPL
832293	2010 BK_{128}	—	October 24, 2009	Kitt Peak	Spacewatch	EMA	3.4 km	MPC · JPL
832294	2010 BZ_{128}	—	January 31, 2010	WISE	WISE	·	3.8 km	MPC · JPL
832295	2010 BA_{129}	—	January 31, 2010	WISE	WISE	·	2.4 km	MPC · JPL
832296	2010 BL_{129}	—	May 17, 2010	Mount Lemmon	Mount Lemmon Survey	·	2.0 km	MPC · JPL
832297	2010 BJ_{130}	—	April 14, 2010	Kitt Peak	Spacewatch	DOR	1.6 km	MPC · JPL
832298	2010 BA_{142}	—	October 20, 2007	Mount Lemmon	Mount Lemmon Survey	·	2.5 km	MPC · JPL
832299	2010 BD_{144}	—	July 15, 2010	WISE	WISE	·	2.2 km	MPC · JPL
832300	2010 BO_{149}	—	July 23, 2010	WISE	WISE	·	1.9 km	MPC · JPL

== 832301–832400 ==
back to top

Designation			Discovery			Properties		Ref
Permanent	Provisional	Named after	Date	Site	Discoverer(s)	Category	Diam.	Ref
832301	2010 BE_{151}	—	May 16, 2010	Mount Lemmon	Mount Lemmon Survey	·	2.1 km	MPC · JPL
832302	2010 BT_{152}	—	April 19, 2017	Mount Lemmon	Mount Lemmon Survey	·	2.1 km	MPC · JPL
832303	2010 BS_{153}	—	December 20, 2009	Kitt Peak	Spacewatch	·	1.7 km	MPC · JPL
832304	2010 CQ_{1}	—	October 15, 2009	Siding Spring	SSS	PHO	2.1 km	MPC · JPL
832305	2010 CH_{6}	—	February 6, 2010	WISE	WISE	·	2.2 km	MPC · JPL
832306	2010 CM_{6}	—	February 6, 2010	WISE	WISE	·	3.4 km	MPC · JPL
832307	2010 CE_{7}	—	February 6, 2010	WISE	WISE	·	3.0 km	MPC · JPL
832308	2010 CF_{7}	—	November 26, 2009	Catalina	CSS	EUP	3.6 km	MPC · JPL
832309	2010 CX_{7}	—	February 7, 2010	WISE	WISE	·	3.4 km	MPC · JPL
832310	2010 CZ_{7}	—	October 14, 2009	Mount Lemmon	Mount Lemmon Survey	(5)	1.4 km	MPC · JPL
832311	2010 CD_{10}	—	February 8, 2010	WISE	WISE	·	2.7 km	MPC · JPL
832312	2010 CM_{11}	—	January 31, 2009	Mount Lemmon	Mount Lemmon Survey	·	4.8 km	MPC · JPL
832313	2010 CR_{12}	—	February 9, 2010	WISE	WISE	·	2.8 km	MPC · JPL
832314	2010 CS_{12}	—	February 9, 2010	WISE	WISE	·	2.1 km	MPC · JPL
832315	2010 CE_{13}	—	February 9, 2010	WISE	WISE	T_{j} (2.98)	2.7 km	MPC · JPL
832316	2010 CX_{13}	—	September 22, 2009	Mount Lemmon	Mount Lemmon Survey	·	1.8 km	MPC · JPL
832317	2010 CG_{14}	—	November 24, 2009	Catalina	CSS	THB	2.9 km	MPC · JPL
832318	2010 CH_{14}	—	February 10, 2010	WISE	WISE	·	2.4 km	MPC · JPL
832319	2010 CO_{15}	—	February 10, 2010	WISE	WISE	·	3.1 km	MPC · JPL
832320	2010 CY_{15}	—	February 10, 2010	WISE	WISE	EUN	2.6 km	MPC · JPL
832321	2010 CU_{16}	—	September 22, 2009	Mount Lemmon	Mount Lemmon Survey	·	3.0 km	MPC · JPL
832322	2010 CB_{17}	—	February 11, 2010	WISE	WISE	·	2.1 km	MPC · JPL
832323	2010 CA_{19}	—	February 12, 2010	Dauban	C. Rinner, Kugel, F.	·	2.8 km	MPC · JPL
832324	2010 CP_{20}	—	February 9, 2010	Kitt Peak	Spacewatch	·	1.2 km	MPC · JPL
832325	2010 CA_{22}	—	March 21, 1999	Sacramento Peak	SDSS	MAS	680 m	MPC · JPL
832326	2010 CD_{26}	—	February 9, 2010	Mount Lemmon	Mount Lemmon Survey	·	1.1 km	MPC · JPL
832327	2010 CJ_{30}	—	February 9, 2010	Mount Lemmon	Mount Lemmon Survey	·	1.2 km	MPC · JPL
832328	2010 CJ_{34}	—	February 10, 2010	Kitt Peak	Spacewatch	·	730 m	MPC · JPL
832329	2010 CR_{44}	—	February 15, 2010	Kitt Peak	Spacewatch	·	2.7 km	MPC · JPL
832330	2010 CD_{45}	—	December 23, 2008	La Sagra	OAM	PHO	2.9 km	MPC · JPL
832331	2010 CE_{46}	—	February 12, 2010	WISE	WISE	·	2.3 km	MPC · JPL
832332	2010 CJ_{46}	—	February 12, 2010	WISE	WISE	PHO	1.7 km	MPC · JPL
832333	2010 CY_{47}	—	December 31, 2008	Kitt Peak	Spacewatch	DOR	2.2 km	MPC · JPL
832334	2010 CG_{48}	—	February 12, 2010	WISE	WISE	·	1.6 km	MPC · JPL
832335	2010 CY_{48}	—	February 12, 2010	WISE	WISE	·	2.9 km	MPC · JPL
832336	2010 CR_{49}	—	February 13, 2010	WISE	WISE	·	4.0 km	MPC · JPL
832337	2010 CQ_{50}	—	February 13, 2010	WISE	WISE	·	2.2 km	MPC · JPL
832338	2010 CL_{51}	—	November 26, 2009	Kitt Peak	Spacewatch	PHO	730 m	MPC · JPL
832339	2010 CS_{51}	—	February 13, 2010	WISE	WISE	·	2.6 km	MPC · JPL
832340	2010 CH_{52}	—	February 13, 2010	WISE	WISE	EUP	2.6 km	MPC · JPL
832341	2010 CV_{52}	—	February 14, 2010	WISE	WISE	·	3.9 km	MPC · JPL
832342	2010 CX_{52}	—	February 14, 2010	WISE	WISE	·	3.1 km	MPC · JPL
832343	2010 CL_{53}	—	January 28, 2004	Sacramento Peak	SDSS	T_{j} (2.98)	3.0 km	MPC · JPL
832344	2010 CN_{53}	—	October 23, 2003	Kitt Peak	Spacewatch	·	2.6 km	MPC · JPL
832345	2010 CO_{53}	—	February 14, 2010	WISE	WISE	·	2.8 km	MPC · JPL
832346	2010 CF_{54}	—	February 14, 2010	WISE	WISE	·	2.8 km	MPC · JPL
832347	2010 CA_{56}	—	January 12, 2010	Kitt Peak	Spacewatch	·	3.8 km	MPC · JPL
832348	2010 CB_{57}	—	February 15, 2010	Catalina	CSS	PHO	870 m	MPC · JPL
832349	2010 CQ_{57}	—	January 19, 2005	Kitt Peak	Spacewatch	EUP	2.4 km	MPC · JPL
832350	2010 CW_{57}	—	November 17, 2009	Catalina	CSS	·	1.8 km	MPC · JPL
832351	2010 CT_{61}	—	January 28, 2004	Kitt Peak	Spacewatch	THM	1.6 km	MPC · JPL
832352	2010 CX_{61}	—	February 9, 2010	Kitt Peak	Spacewatch	·	3.1 km	MPC · JPL
832353	2010 CD_{63}	—	February 9, 2010	Kitt Peak	Spacewatch	·	2.6 km	MPC · JPL
832354	2010 CH_{67}	—	February 10, 2010	Kitt Peak	Spacewatch	·	1.3 km	MPC · JPL
832355	2010 CR_{69}	—	January 13, 2010	Mount Lemmon	Mount Lemmon Survey	T_{j} (2.93)	2.4 km	MPC · JPL
832356	2010 CM_{71}	—	January 8, 2010	Kitt Peak	Spacewatch	·	730 m	MPC · JPL
832357	2010 CQ_{74}	—	September 27, 2008	Mount Lemmon	Mount Lemmon Survey	·	1.2 km	MPC · JPL
832358	2010 CP_{76}	—	February 13, 2010	Mount Lemmon	Mount Lemmon Survey	THM	1.6 km	MPC · JPL
832359	2010 CB_{77}	—	April 14, 2007	Kitt Peak	Spacewatch	·	370 m	MPC · JPL
832360	2010 CA_{78}	—	February 13, 2010	Mount Lemmon	Mount Lemmon Survey	·	1.4 km	MPC · JPL
832361	2010 CN_{78}	—	February 13, 2010	Mount Lemmon	Mount Lemmon Survey	EUP	3.9 km	MPC · JPL
832362	2010 CA_{80}	—	March 20, 1999	Sacramento Peak	SDSS	·	2.1 km	MPC · JPL
832363	2010 CC_{84}	—	February 14, 2010	Mount Lemmon	Mount Lemmon Survey	·	1.3 km	MPC · JPL
832364	2010 CU_{84}	—	February 13, 2010	Catalina	CSS	·	3.6 km	MPC · JPL
832365	2010 CO_{87}	—	February 14, 2010	Mount Lemmon	Mount Lemmon Survey	H	300 m	MPC · JPL
832366	2010 CS_{90}	—	October 8, 2008	Mount Lemmon	Mount Lemmon Survey	·	1.4 km	MPC · JPL
832367	2010 CB_{91}	—	February 14, 2010	Mount Lemmon	Mount Lemmon Survey	·	2.4 km	MPC · JPL
832368	2010 CE_{94}	—	March 20, 1999	Sacramento Peak	SDSS	MAS	750 m	MPC · JPL
832369	2010 CX_{94}	—	February 14, 2010	Kitt Peak	Spacewatch	·	810 m	MPC · JPL
832370	2010 CB_{97}	—	February 14, 2010	Mount Lemmon	Mount Lemmon Survey	PHO	1.9 km	MPC · JPL
832371	2010 CD_{97}	—	February 14, 2010	Kitt Peak	Spacewatch	·	3.3 km	MPC · JPL
832372	2010 CY_{99}	—	February 14, 2010	Mount Lemmon	Mount Lemmon Survey	·	1.5 km	MPC · JPL
832373	2010 CA_{103}	—	January 11, 2010	Kitt Peak	Spacewatch	·	1.0 km	MPC · JPL
832374	2010 CT_{103}	—	February 14, 2010	Kitt Peak	Spacewatch	·	2.0 km	MPC · JPL
832375	2010 CR_{104}	—	February 14, 2010	Mount Lemmon	Mount Lemmon Survey	·	720 m	MPC · JPL
832376	2010 CS_{106}	—	February 14, 2010	Mount Lemmon	Mount Lemmon Survey	·	1.8 km	MPC · JPL
832377	2010 CJ_{109}	—	February 14, 2010	Mount Lemmon	Mount Lemmon Survey	3:2 · SHU	4.0 km	MPC · JPL
832378	2010 CJ_{116}	—	February 14, 2010	Mount Lemmon	Mount Lemmon Survey	·	1.8 km	MPC · JPL
832379	2010 CP_{117}	—	December 17, 2009	Kitt Peak	Spacewatch	URS	3.8 km	MPC · JPL
832380	2010 CY_{120}	—	March 20, 1999	Sacramento Peak	SDSS	·	3.7 km	MPC · JPL
832381	2010 CH_{124}	—	February 15, 2010	Mount Lemmon	Mount Lemmon Survey	·	950 m	MPC · JPL
832382	2010 CX_{125}	—	February 15, 2010	Mount Lemmon	Mount Lemmon Survey	·	2.9 km	MPC · JPL
832383	2010 CB_{126}	—	February 15, 2010	Mount Lemmon	Mount Lemmon Survey	·	830 m	MPC · JPL
832384	2010 CN_{126}	—	February 15, 2010	Mount Lemmon	Mount Lemmon Survey	NYS	730 m	MPC · JPL
832385	2010 CW_{131}	—	February 14, 2010	WISE	WISE	·	3.1 km	MPC · JPL
832386	2010 CA_{132}	—	February 15, 2010	WISE	WISE	·	3.3 km	MPC · JPL
832387	2010 CN_{132}	—	March 9, 2006	Catalina	CSS	PHO	2.4 km	MPC · JPL
832388	2010 CX_{132}	—	November 23, 2009	Mount Lemmon	Mount Lemmon Survey	LIX	3.1 km	MPC · JPL
832389	2010 CH_{133}	—	November 23, 2009	Catalina	CSS	·	2.2 km	MPC · JPL
832390	2010 CE_{134}	—	February 15, 2010	WISE	WISE	·	2.1 km	MPC · JPL
832391	2010 CJ_{134}	—	February 15, 2010	WISE	WISE	·	4.0 km	MPC · JPL
832392	2010 CC_{136}	—	February 15, 2010	WISE	WISE	·	2.3 km	MPC · JPL
832393	2010 CV_{136}	—	February 15, 2010	WISE	WISE	PHO	790 m	MPC · JPL
832394	2010 CX_{139}	—	February 13, 2010	WISE	WISE	·	2.9 km	MPC · JPL
832395	2010 CK_{141}	—	February 17, 2010	Mount Lemmon	Mount Lemmon Survey	·	2.8 km	MPC · JPL
832396	2010 CW_{145}	—	February 14, 2010	Catalina	CSS	·	3.9 km	MPC · JPL
832397	2010 CR_{147}	—	February 13, 2010	Catalina	CSS	·	2.6 km	MPC · JPL
832398	2010 CY_{150}	—	February 14, 2010	Mount Lemmon	Mount Lemmon Survey	·	1.5 km	MPC · JPL
832399	2010 CJ_{157}	—	February 15, 2010	Kitt Peak	Spacewatch	·	1.6 km	MPC · JPL
832400	2010 CH_{162}	—	February 9, 2010	Kitt Peak	Spacewatch	·	450 m	MPC · JPL

== 832401–832500 ==
back to top

Designation			Discovery			Properties		Ref
Permanent	Provisional	Named after	Date	Site	Discoverer(s)	Category	Diam.	Ref
832401	2010 CD_{163}	—	February 9, 2010	Mount Lemmon	Mount Lemmon Survey	·	1.5 km	MPC · JPL
832402	2010 CT_{163}	—	February 10, 2010	Kitt Peak	Spacewatch	EUP	3.5 km	MPC · JPL
832403	2010 CD_{166}	—	February 11, 2010	WISE	WISE	·	2.3 km	MPC · JPL
832404	2010 CN_{169}	—	February 9, 2010	Mount Lemmon	Mount Lemmon Survey	EOS	1.3 km	MPC · JPL
832405	2010 CX_{171}	—	February 15, 2010	Kitt Peak	Spacewatch	·	4.0 km	MPC · JPL
832406	2010 CG_{179}	—	December 20, 2009	Mount Lemmon	Mount Lemmon Survey	·	1.7 km	MPC · JPL
832407	2010 CR_{179}	—	February 14, 2010	Catalina	CSS	·	2.6 km	MPC · JPL
832408	2010 CE_{182}	—	October 6, 2008	Mount Lemmon	Mount Lemmon Survey	·	1.4 km	MPC · JPL
832409	2010 CE_{183}	—	February 16, 2010	Catalina	CSS	·	2.5 km	MPC · JPL
832410	2010 CQ_{184}	—	February 15, 2010	Mount Lemmon	Mount Lemmon Survey	JUN	860 m	MPC · JPL
832411	2010 CA_{186}	—	October 27, 2009	Mount Lemmon	Mount Lemmon Survey	·	1.8 km	MPC · JPL
832412	2010 CU_{186}	—	February 10, 2010	WISE	WISE	·	1.3 km	MPC · JPL
832413	2010 CX_{186}	—	October 14, 2009	Mount Lemmon	Mount Lemmon Survey	·	2.3 km	MPC · JPL
832414	2010 CF_{187}	—	February 10, 2010	WISE	WISE	EUP	2.4 km	MPC · JPL
832415	2010 CY_{187}	—	April 15, 2010	Mount Lemmon	Mount Lemmon Survey	·	1.3 km	MPC · JPL
832416	2010 CQ_{190}	—	April 9, 2010	Mount Lemmon	Mount Lemmon Survey	·	2.6 km	MPC · JPL
832417	2010 CN_{191}	—	February 12, 2010	WISE	WISE	·	2.5 km	MPC · JPL
832418	2010 CR_{192}	—	November 23, 2009	Mount Lemmon	Mount Lemmon Survey	LIX	2.9 km	MPC · JPL
832419	2010 CT_{192}	—	February 12, 2010	WISE	WISE	T_{j} (2.98) · EUP	3.8 km	MPC · JPL
832420	2010 CU_{192}	—	April 16, 2004	Sacramento Peak	SDSS	T_{j} (2.98)	2.5 km	MPC · JPL
832421	2010 CW_{192}	—	February 12, 2010	WISE	WISE	·	3.1 km	MPC · JPL
832422	2010 CC_{193}	—	February 12, 2010	WISE	WISE	·	1.4 km	MPC · JPL
832423	2010 CU_{194}	—	February 13, 2010	WISE	WISE	·	910 m	MPC · JPL
832424	2010 CY_{195}	—	May 12, 2010	Kitt Peak	Spacewatch	·	2.5 km	MPC · JPL
832425	2010 CK_{196}	—	November 25, 2009	Kitt Peak	Spacewatch	·	4.4 km	MPC · JPL
832426	2010 CC_{198}	—	February 14, 2010	WISE	WISE	·	1.1 km	MPC · JPL
832427	2010 CN_{198}	—	September 29, 2003	Kitt Peak	Spacewatch	THB	1.8 km	MPC · JPL
832428	2010 CR_{198}	—	February 14, 2010	WISE	WISE	THB	1.9 km	MPC · JPL
832429	2010 CR_{199}	—	February 2, 2009	Mount Lemmon	Mount Lemmon Survey	·	2.7 km	MPC · JPL
832430	2010 CK_{200}	—	December 10, 2009	Catalina	CSS	·	1.7 km	MPC · JPL
832431	2010 CE_{201}	—	September 16, 2003	Kitt Peak	Spacewatch	·	2.2 km	MPC · JPL
832432	2010 CN_{201}	—	February 15, 2010	WISE	WISE	·	3.0 km	MPC · JPL
832433	2010 CP_{201}	—	February 15, 2010	WISE	WISE	·	1.9 km	MPC · JPL
832434	2010 CQ_{202}	—	February 3, 2010	WISE	WISE	LIX	3.1 km	MPC · JPL
832435	2010 CZ_{205}	—	February 4, 2010	WISE	WISE	·	2.3 km	MPC · JPL
832436	2010 CE_{206}	—	December 5, 2005	Kitt Peak	Spacewatch	·	1.7 km	MPC · JPL
832437	2010 CJ_{206}	—	November 10, 2009	Mount Lemmon	Mount Lemmon Survey	·	2.0 km	MPC · JPL
832438	2010 CT_{207}	—	November 19, 2009	Catalina	CSS	·	2.5 km	MPC · JPL
832439	2010 CV_{207}	—	October 27, 2009	Mount Lemmon	Mount Lemmon Survey	SYL	2.9 km	MPC · JPL
832440	2010 CJ_{209}	—	January 6, 2010	Mount Lemmon	Mount Lemmon Survey	KON	2.2 km	MPC · JPL
832441	2010 CP_{209}	—	February 5, 2010	WISE	WISE	·	2.6 km	MPC · JPL
832442	2010 CF_{210}	—	September 22, 2009	Mount Lemmon	Mount Lemmon Survey	·	2.3 km	MPC · JPL
832443	2010 CM_{210}	—	November 9, 2009	Kitt Peak	Spacewatch	·	2.3 km	MPC · JPL
832444	2010 CN_{210}	—	November 1, 2005	Kitt Peak	Spacewatch	·	2.0 km	MPC · JPL
832445	2010 CB_{212}	—	February 5, 2010	WISE	WISE	·	2.0 km	MPC · JPL
832446	2010 CN_{212}	—	February 6, 2010	WISE	WISE	·	1.7 km	MPC · JPL
832447	2010 CQ_{212}	—	February 6, 2010	WISE	WISE	·	1.8 km	MPC · JPL
832448	2010 CH_{214}	—	October 24, 2009	Mount Lemmon	Mount Lemmon Survey	·	2.0 km	MPC · JPL
832449	2010 CQ_{214}	—	February 6, 2010	WISE	WISE	·	2.0 km	MPC · JPL
832450	2010 CX_{214}	—	September 5, 2019	Mount Lemmon	Mount Lemmon Survey	·	1.2 km	MPC · JPL
832451	2010 CG_{215}	—	February 6, 2010	WISE	WISE	·	2.5 km	MPC · JPL
832452	2010 CN_{215}	—	February 6, 2010	WISE	WISE	·	2.8 km	MPC · JPL
832453	2010 CH_{216}	—	February 7, 2010	WISE	WISE	EOS	1.6 km	MPC · JPL
832454	2010 CL_{216}	—	February 7, 2010	WISE	WISE	·	2.9 km	MPC · JPL
832455	2010 CM_{216}	—	February 7, 2010	WISE	WISE	URS	3.1 km	MPC · JPL
832456	2010 CD_{217}	—	October 25, 2009	Mount Lemmon	Mount Lemmon Survey	L4	7.3 km	MPC · JPL
832457	2010 CW_{217}	—	May 13, 2010	Mount Lemmon	Mount Lemmon Survey	3:2	3.4 km	MPC · JPL
832458	2010 CE_{218}	—	May 6, 2010	Mount Lemmon	Mount Lemmon Survey	·	2.9 km	MPC · JPL
832459	2010 CH_{218}	—	February 7, 2010	WISE	WISE	(895)	2.7 km	MPC · JPL
832460	2010 CX_{218}	—	May 13, 2010	Catalina	CSS	PHO	780 m	MPC · JPL
832461	2010 CK_{219}	—	February 7, 2010	WISE	WISE	·	2.7 km	MPC · JPL
832462	2010 CF_{220}	—	October 14, 2009	Mount Lemmon	Mount Lemmon Survey	·	810 m	MPC · JPL
832463	2010 CW_{220}	—	November 20, 2009	Kitt Peak	Spacewatch	·	2.0 km	MPC · JPL
832464	2010 CY_{220}	—	November 19, 2009	Catalina	CSS	·	2.1 km	MPC · JPL
832465	2010 CX_{221}	—	February 8, 2010	WISE	WISE	·	2.8 km	MPC · JPL
832466	2010 CJ_{222}	—	February 8, 2010	WISE	WISE	·	3.5 km	MPC · JPL
832467	2010 CW_{222}	—	February 8, 2010	WISE	WISE	·	2.4 km	MPC · JPL
832468	2010 CH_{223}	—	June 17, 2010	Mount Lemmon	Mount Lemmon Survey	·	2.5 km	MPC · JPL
832469	2010 CK_{223}	—	February 8, 2010	WISE	WISE	·	2.5 km	MPC · JPL
832470	2010 CM_{223}	—	November 24, 2009	Catalina	CSS	·	2.1 km	MPC · JPL
832471	2010 CE_{224}	—	February 8, 2010	WISE	WISE	(5651)	3.3 km	MPC · JPL
832472	2010 CR_{225}	—	January 27, 2012	Mount Lemmon	Mount Lemmon Survey	L4	8.1 km	MPC · JPL
832473	2010 CR_{227}	—	November 22, 2009	Mount Lemmon	Mount Lemmon Survey	·	2.4 km	MPC · JPL
832474	2010 CH_{228}	—	October 25, 2009	Mount Lemmon	Mount Lemmon Survey	·	1.9 km	MPC · JPL
832475	2010 CG_{230}	—	February 10, 2010	WISE	WISE	·	2.1 km	MPC · JPL
832476	2010 CN_{230}	—	February 10, 2010	WISE	WISE	·	1.8 km	MPC · JPL
832477	2010 CR_{231}	—	February 1, 2010	WISE	WISE	(7605)	2.5 km	MPC · JPL
832478	2010 CN_{232}	—	February 1, 2010	WISE	WISE	L4	10 km	MPC · JPL
832479	2010 CR_{232}	—	May 16, 2010	Mount Lemmon	Mount Lemmon Survey	·	3.5 km	MPC · JPL
832480	2010 CT_{233}	—	February 1, 2010	WISE	WISE	ULA	4.4 km	MPC · JPL
832481	2010 CY_{233}	—	February 1, 2010	WISE	WISE	L4 · HEK	6.6 km	MPC · JPL
832482	2010 CE_{234}	—	February 1, 2010	WISE	WISE	·	3.1 km	MPC · JPL
832483	2010 CB_{235}	—	August 1, 2010	WISE	WISE	·	2.7 km	MPC · JPL
832484	2010 CC_{235}	—	February 1, 2010	WISE	WISE	·	2.4 km	MPC · JPL
832485	2010 CK_{235}	—	February 1, 2010	WISE	WISE	·	1.5 km	MPC · JPL
832486	2010 CQ_{237}	—	April 17, 2010	Kitt Peak	Spacewatch	·	1.8 km	MPC · JPL
832487	2010 CG_{238}	—	February 1, 2010	WISE	WISE	T_{j} (2.99)	6.0 km	MPC · JPL
832488	2010 CT_{238}	—	February 2, 2010	WISE	WISE	PHO	2.2 km	MPC · JPL
832489	2010 CU_{238}	—	October 31, 2008	Mount Lemmon	Mount Lemmon Survey	EUP	4.8 km	MPC · JPL
832490	2010 CU_{239}	—	February 2, 2010	WISE	WISE	LIX	2.8 km	MPC · JPL
832491	2010 CD_{241}	—	February 2, 2010	WISE	WISE	·	1.9 km	MPC · JPL
832492	2010 CG_{241}	—	July 25, 2010	WISE	WISE	·	2.9 km	MPC · JPL
832493	2010 CJ_{241}	—	February 2, 2010	WISE	WISE	·	2.4 km	MPC · JPL
832494	2010 CN_{241}	—	February 2, 2010	WISE	WISE	·	2.2 km	MPC · JPL
832495	2010 CT_{241}	—	January 6, 2003	Kitt Peak	Deep Lens Survey	T_{j} (2.98) · 3:2	4.2 km	MPC · JPL
832496	2010 CC_{242}	—	December 9, 2015	Haleakala	ATLAS	PHO	1.1 km	MPC · JPL
832497	2010 CM_{242}	—	November 26, 2009	Mount Lemmon	Mount Lemmon Survey	·	2.1 km	MPC · JPL
832498	2010 CG_{243}	—	October 26, 2009	Mount Lemmon	Mount Lemmon Survey	·	2.3 km	MPC · JPL
832499	2010 CN_{243}	—	January 4, 1994	Kitt Peak	Spacewatch	(10369)	3.5 km	MPC · JPL
832500	2010 CD_{244}	—	February 2, 2010	WISE	WISE	·	2.2 km	MPC · JPL

== 832501–832600 ==
back to top

Designation			Discovery			Properties		Ref
Permanent	Provisional	Named after	Date	Site	Discoverer(s)	Category	Diam.	Ref
832501	2010 CE_{244}	—	August 7, 2008	Kitt Peak	Spacewatch	·	3.1 km	MPC · JPL
832502	2010 CN_{244}	—	February 3, 2010	WISE	WISE	·	2.3 km	MPC · JPL
832503	2010 CQ_{244}	—	September 19, 1998	Sacramento Peak	SDSS	·	3.0 km	MPC · JPL
832504	2010 CV_{244}	—	October 27, 2009	Mount Lemmon	Mount Lemmon Survey	·	3.3 km	MPC · JPL
832505	2010 CO_{245}	—	February 3, 2010	WISE	WISE	·	2.2 km	MPC · JPL
832506	2010 CR_{245}	—	December 27, 2006	Mount Lemmon	Mount Lemmon Survey	PHO	1.9 km	MPC · JPL
832507	2010 CN_{246}	—	August 23, 2004	Kitt Peak	Spacewatch	DOR	1.9 km	MPC · JPL
832508	2010 CS_{247}	—	August 22, 2014	Haleakala	Pan-STARRS 1	LIX	2.9 km	MPC · JPL
832509	2010 CK_{252}	—	February 14, 2010	Kitt Peak	Spacewatch	·	1.1 km	MPC · JPL
832510	2010 CC_{254}	—	March 22, 2015	Haleakala	Pan-STARRS 1	·	2.6 km	MPC · JPL
832511	2010 CD_{259}	—	May 5, 2010	Mount Lemmon	Mount Lemmon Survey	LIX	2.9 km	MPC · JPL
832512	2010 CJ_{259}	—	December 4, 2015	Haleakala	Pan-STARRS 1	THB	2.1 km	MPC · JPL
832513	2010 CN_{265}	—	August 4, 2010	WISE	WISE	·	2.4 km	MPC · JPL
832514	2010 CV_{265}	—	September 19, 2009	Mount Lemmon	Mount Lemmon Survey	LIX	2.1 km	MPC · JPL
832515	2010 CN_{269}	—	February 15, 2010	WISE	WISE	ARM	2.4 km	MPC · JPL
832516	2010 CP_{270}	—	July 16, 2013	Haleakala	Pan-STARRS 1	·	1.6 km	MPC · JPL
832517	2010 CZ_{270}	—	February 15, 2010	Catalina	CSS	·	1.7 km	MPC · JPL
832518	2010 CE_{271}	—	January 3, 2014	Catalina	CSS	·	1.3 km	MPC · JPL
832519	2010 CR_{271}	—	January 24, 2014	Haleakala	Pan-STARRS 1	·	1 km	MPC · JPL
832520	2010 CO_{272}	—	February 15, 2010	Siding Spring	SSS	EUP	4.0 km	MPC · JPL
832521	2010 CX_{272}	—	May 20, 2015	Haleakala	Pan-STARRS 1	·	970 m	MPC · JPL
832522	2010 CS_{273}	—	April 9, 2015	Mount Lemmon	Mount Lemmon Survey	·	1.2 km	MPC · JPL
832523	2010 CK_{274}	—	February 14, 2010	Kitt Peak	Spacewatch	·	3.0 km	MPC · JPL
832524	2010 CL_{274}	—	February 3, 2017	Haleakala	Pan-STARRS 1	·	580 m	MPC · JPL
832525	2010 CE_{277}	—	February 13, 2010	Mount Lemmon	Mount Lemmon Survey	·	1.2 km	MPC · JPL
832526	2010 CG_{278}	—	February 15, 2010	Mount Lemmon	Mount Lemmon Survey	T_{j} (2.95) · 3:2	3.7 km	MPC · JPL
832527	2010 DY	—	January 11, 2010	Kitt Peak	Spacewatch	MAS	490 m	MPC · JPL
832528	2010 DM_{1}	—	January 12, 2010	Kitt Peak	Spacewatch	EUP	5.0 km	MPC · JPL
832529	2010 DO_{6}	—	February 16, 2010	Kitt Peak	Spacewatch	·	750 m	MPC · JPL
832530	2010 DX_{11}	—	February 16, 2010	Mount Lemmon	Mount Lemmon Survey	·	1.1 km	MPC · JPL
832531	2010 DL_{12}	—	October 23, 2009	Kitt Peak	Spacewatch	·	4.3 km	MPC · JPL
832532	2010 DM_{13}	—	February 16, 2010	WISE	WISE	·	1.7 km	MPC · JPL
832533	2010 DA_{14}	—	February 17, 2010	WISE	WISE	·	3.1 km	MPC · JPL
832534	2010 DK_{14}	—	February 17, 2010	WISE	WISE	·	2.6 km	MPC · JPL
832535	2010 DU_{14}	—	February 16, 2010	WISE	WISE	·	2.8 km	MPC · JPL
832536	2010 DE_{15}	—	February 16, 2010	WISE	WISE	·	1.4 km	MPC · JPL
832537	2010 DM_{15}	—	February 16, 2010	WISE	WISE	LIX	2.8 km	MPC · JPL
832538	2010 DT_{16}	—	February 16, 2010	WISE	WISE	T_{j} (2.99) · EUP	3.0 km	MPC · JPL
832539	2010 DB_{18}	—	February 17, 2010	WISE	WISE	·	2.8 km	MPC · JPL
832540	2010 DS_{19}	—	February 17, 2010	WISE	WISE	T_{j} (2.96)	3.3 km	MPC · JPL
832541	2010 DU_{19}	—	February 17, 2010	WISE	WISE	·	2.8 km	MPC · JPL
832542	2010 DV_{20}	—	February 16, 2010	WISE	WISE	·	2.4 km	MPC · JPL
832543	2010 DL_{21}	—	February 17, 2010	WISE	WISE	·	2.8 km	MPC · JPL
832544	2010 DP_{21}	—	February 9, 2010	Mount Lemmon	Mount Lemmon Survey	·	5.1 km	MPC · JPL
832545	2010 DJ_{22}	—	February 18, 2010	WISE	WISE	·	1.5 km	MPC · JPL
832546	2010 DL_{22}	—	February 18, 2010	WISE	WISE	EUP	2.2 km	MPC · JPL
832547	2010 DV_{22}	—	February 18, 2010	WISE	WISE	·	2.2 km	MPC · JPL
832548	2010 DX_{22}	—	February 18, 2010	WISE	WISE	·	2.5 km	MPC · JPL
832549	2010 DY_{22}	—	February 18, 2010	WISE	WISE	·	3.1 km	MPC · JPL
832550	2010 DL_{23}	—	February 18, 2010	WISE	WISE	LUT	3.4 km	MPC · JPL
832551	2010 DE_{24}	—	February 19, 2010	WISE	WISE	·	1.6 km	MPC · JPL
832552	2010 DY_{24}	—	February 19, 2010	WISE	WISE	·	1.7 km	MPC · JPL
832553	2010 DC_{25}	—	September 22, 2003	Kitt Peak	Spacewatch	·	3.0 km	MPC · JPL
832554	2010 DP_{26}	—	February 20, 2010	WISE	WISE	·	2.5 km	MPC · JPL
832555	2010 DS_{27}	—	February 18, 2010	WISE	WISE	·	1.7 km	MPC · JPL
832556	2010 DB_{28}	—	December 1, 2005	Kitt Peak	Spacewatch	·	1.9 km	MPC · JPL
832557	2010 DO_{28}	—	February 18, 2010	WISE	WISE	KON	1.9 km	MPC · JPL
832558	2010 DW_{28}	—	October 12, 2007	Mount Lemmon	Mount Lemmon Survey	·	2.8 km	MPC · JPL
832559	2010 DQ_{30}	—	February 19, 2010	WISE	WISE	T_{j} (2.98)	4.5 km	MPC · JPL
832560	2010 DS_{30}	—	February 19, 2010	WISE	WISE	·	2.1 km	MPC · JPL
832561	2010 DQ_{31}	—	February 20, 2010	WISE	WISE	·	2.1 km	MPC · JPL
832562	2010 DR_{31}	—	February 20, 2010	WISE	WISE	·	1.5 km	MPC · JPL
832563	2010 DU_{31}	—	February 20, 2010	WISE	WISE	·	2.8 km	MPC · JPL
832564	2010 DX_{31}	—	July 31, 2005	Palomar	NEAT	EUP	4.3 km	MPC · JPL
832565	2010 DD_{32}	—	December 13, 1999	Kitt Peak	Spacewatch	·	3.4 km	MPC · JPL
832566	2010 DE_{35}	—	February 16, 2010	Kitt Peak	Spacewatch	·	2.1 km	MPC · JPL
832567	2010 DL_{39}	—	February 16, 2010	Mount Lemmon	Mount Lemmon Survey	·	2.0 km	MPC · JPL
832568	2010 DE_{40}	—	October 28, 2017	Haleakala	Pan-STARRS 1	·	1.2 km	MPC · JPL
832569	2010 DK_{48}	—	February 17, 2010	Mount Lemmon	Mount Lemmon Survey	·	3.2 km	MPC · JPL
832570	2010 DV_{50}	—	February 21, 2010	WISE	WISE	·	2.5 km	MPC · JPL
832571	2010 DW_{50}	—	February 21, 2010	WISE	WISE	·	2.1 km	MPC · JPL
832572	2010 DG_{51}	—	February 21, 2010	WISE	WISE	DOR	2.4 km	MPC · JPL
832573	2010 DF_{52}	—	February 21, 2010	WISE	WISE	EUP	2.3 km	MPC · JPL
832574	2010 DP_{53}	—	February 22, 2010	WISE	WISE	THB	2.3 km	MPC · JPL
832575	2010 DV_{53}	—	February 23, 2010	WISE	WISE	EUP	2.4 km	MPC · JPL
832576	2010 DK_{55}	—	February 21, 2010	WISE	WISE	URS	3.2 km	MPC · JPL
832577	2010 DP_{55}	—	January 1, 2009	Kitt Peak	Spacewatch	LIX	2.8 km	MPC · JPL
832578	2010 DY_{55}	—	February 22, 2010	WISE	WISE	EUP	2.7 km	MPC · JPL
832579	2010 DH_{57}	—	November 27, 2009	Mount Lemmon	Mount Lemmon Survey	·	2.7 km	MPC · JPL
832580	2010 DD_{58}	—	January 8, 2010	Catalina	CSS	·	1.8 km	MPC · JPL
832581	2010 DU_{58}	—	February 24, 2010	WISE	WISE	·	2.0 km	MPC · JPL
832582	2010 DG_{59}	—	February 24, 2010	WISE	WISE	·	3.2 km	MPC · JPL
832583	2010 DH_{61}	—	February 25, 2010	WISE	WISE	LIX	3.1 km	MPC · JPL
832584	2010 DQ_{61}	—	February 25, 2010	WISE	WISE	EUP	3.2 km	MPC · JPL
832585	2010 DC_{63}	—	November 7, 2007	Kitt Peak	Spacewatch	·	4.8 km	MPC · JPL
832586	2010 DR_{63}	—	February 26, 2010	WISE	WISE	T_{j} (2.97)	3.0 km	MPC · JPL
832587	2010 DH_{64}	—	February 26, 2010	WISE	WISE	EUP	2.5 km	MPC · JPL
832588	2010 DY_{64}	—	February 26, 2010	WISE	WISE	·	2.3 km	MPC · JPL
832589	2010 DR_{65}	—	October 1, 2009	Mount Lemmon	Mount Lemmon Survey	LIX	3.0 km	MPC · JPL
832590	2010 DA_{67}	—	February 27, 2010	WISE	WISE	·	2.7 km	MPC · JPL
832591	2010 DC_{67}	—	February 27, 2010	WISE	WISE	·	2.7 km	MPC · JPL
832592	2010 DF_{68}	—	December 11, 2009	Mount Lemmon	Mount Lemmon Survey	·	3.6 km	MPC · JPL
832593	2010 DK_{69}	—	February 28, 2010	WISE	WISE	EUP	2.8 km	MPC · JPL
832594	2010 DP_{70}	—	February 28, 2010	WISE	WISE	·	1.7 km	MPC · JPL
832595	2010 DW_{70}	—	November 27, 2009	Mount Lemmon	Mount Lemmon Survey	LIX	2.4 km	MPC · JPL
832596	2010 DD_{71}	—	February 28, 2010	WISE	WISE	·	2.8 km	MPC · JPL
832597	2010 DF_{71}	—	November 13, 2009	La Sagra	OAM	CLO	3.1 km	MPC · JPL
832598	2010 DN_{71}	—	February 28, 2010	WISE	WISE	·	1.5 km	MPC · JPL
832599	2010 DE_{72}	—	February 27, 2010	WISE	WISE	·	3.2 km	MPC · JPL
832600	2010 DO_{72}	—	February 28, 2010	WISE	WISE	EUP	2.4 km	MPC · JPL

== 832601–832700 ==
back to top

Designation			Discovery			Properties		Ref
Permanent	Provisional	Named after	Date	Site	Discoverer(s)	Category	Diam.	Ref
832601	2010 DT_{72}	—	February 28, 2010	WISE	WISE	·	2.9 km	MPC · JPL
832602	2010 DP_{77}	—	February 17, 2010	Catalina	CSS	·	2.4 km	MPC · JPL
832603	2010 DL_{79}	—	March 3, 2005	Catalina	CSS	·	2.5 km	MPC · JPL
832604	2010 DL_{80}	—	October 14, 2001	Sacramento Peak	SDSS	·	2.0 km	MPC · JPL
832605	2010 DJ_{81}	—	December 16, 2009	Mount Lemmon	Mount Lemmon Survey	·	1.7 km	MPC · JPL
832606	2010 DQ_{81}	—	October 21, 2003	Kitt Peak	Spacewatch	(1298)	2.7 km	MPC · JPL
832607	2010 DR_{81}	—	November 9, 2009	Kitt Peak	Spacewatch	·	2.7 km	MPC · JPL
832608	2010 DS_{81}	—	June 5, 2010	Kitt Peak	Spacewatch	3:2	4.3 km	MPC · JPL
832609	2010 DA_{83}	—	March 20, 2015	Haleakala	Pan-STARRS 1	·	2.7 km	MPC · JPL
832610	2010 DP_{84}	—	February 8, 1999	Mauna Kea	C. Veillet, J. Anderson	·	1.6 km	MPC · JPL
832611	2010 DR_{84}	—	February 25, 2010	WISE	WISE	·	1.9 km	MPC · JPL
832612	2010 DE_{85}	—	February 25, 2010	WISE	WISE	·	3.5 km	MPC · JPL
832613	2010 DJ_{86}	—	February 26, 2010	WISE	WISE	·	3.1 km	MPC · JPL
832614	2010 DU_{86}	—	February 26, 2010	WISE	WISE	·	2.8 km	MPC · JPL
832615	2010 DE_{87}	—	February 26, 2010	WISE	WISE	·	1.5 km	MPC · JPL
832616	2010 DL_{87}	—	November 25, 2009	Kitt Peak	Spacewatch	HYG	2.0 km	MPC · JPL
832617	2010 DH_{88}	—	February 27, 2010	WISE	WISE	LIX	2.6 km	MPC · JPL
832618	2010 DJ_{88}	—	February 27, 2010	WISE	WISE	·	3.6 km	MPC · JPL
832619	2010 DT_{88}	—	February 27, 2010	WISE	WISE	·	2.5 km	MPC · JPL
832620	2010 DX_{88}	—	February 27, 2010	WISE	WISE	·	2.7 km	MPC · JPL
832621	2010 DD_{89}	—	December 13, 2009	Mount Lemmon	Mount Lemmon Survey	·	2.5 km	MPC · JPL
832622	2010 DN_{94}	—	August 6, 2010	WISE	WISE	·	2.1 km	MPC · JPL
832623	2010 DU_{96}	—	November 23, 2009	Mount Lemmon	Mount Lemmon Survey	·	890 m	MPC · JPL
832624	2010 DJ_{107}	—	February 18, 2010	Mount Lemmon	Mount Lemmon Survey	·	2.9 km	MPC · JPL
832625	2010 DX_{107}	—	February 17, 2010	Kitt Peak	Spacewatch	·	1.3 km	MPC · JPL
832626	2010 DX_{108}	—	February 17, 2010	Catalina	CSS	·	2.5 km	MPC · JPL
832627	2010 DY_{108}	—	August 15, 2013	Haleakala	Pan-STARRS 1	·	2.0 km	MPC · JPL
832628	2010 DJ_{109}	—	February 16, 2010	Catalina	CSS	JUN	910 m	MPC · JPL
832629	2010 DL_{109}	—	August 14, 2012	Kitt Peak	Spacewatch	HNS	970 m	MPC · JPL
832630	2010 DW_{109}	—	March 6, 2016	Haleakala	Pan-STARRS 1	EOS	1.4 km	MPC · JPL
832631	2010 DA_{110}	—	November 24, 2017	Haleakala	Pan-STARRS 1	H	440 m	MPC · JPL
832632	2010 DZ_{110}	—	February 18, 2010	Kitt Peak	Spacewatch	·	700 m	MPC · JPL
832633	2010 DF_{113}	—	February 18, 2010	Mount Lemmon	Mount Lemmon Survey	EUP	2.7 km	MPC · JPL
832634	2010 DR_{113}	—	February 18, 2010	Mount Lemmon	Mount Lemmon Survey	NYS	800 m	MPC · JPL
832635	2010 DL_{115}	—	February 17, 2010	Kitt Peak	Spacewatch	·	1.2 km	MPC · JPL
832636	2010 ED	—	March 1, 2010	WISE	WISE	·	2.8 km	MPC · JPL
832637	2010 EQ_{2}	—	March 3, 2010	WISE	WISE	·	1.6 km	MPC · JPL
832638	2010 EG_{3}	—	March 1, 2010	WISE	WISE	·	2.2 km	MPC · JPL
832639	2010 EA_{5}	—	March 2, 2010	WISE	WISE	LIX	2.7 km	MPC · JPL
832640	2010 EM_{5}	—	December 18, 2009	Mount Lemmon	Mount Lemmon Survey	LIX	2.6 km	MPC · JPL
832641	2010 EJ_{6}	—	December 17, 2009	Mount Lemmon	Mount Lemmon Survey	LUT	3.2 km	MPC · JPL
832642	2010 EL_{9}	—	July 30, 2008	Mount Lemmon	Mount Lemmon Survey	T_{j} (2.79)	4.1 km	MPC · JPL
832643	2010 EE_{13}	—	September 20, 2008	Mount Lemmon	Mount Lemmon Survey	T_{j} (2.96) · 3:2	3.5 km	MPC · JPL
832644	2010 EN_{16}	—	December 11, 2009	La Sagra	OAM	T_{j} (2.99) · EUP	3.4 km	MPC · JPL
832645	2010 EZ_{16}	—	March 7, 2010	WISE	WISE	EUP	2.2 km	MPC · JPL
832646	2010 ED_{17}	—	March 7, 2010	WISE	WISE	·	2.9 km	MPC · JPL
832647	2010 EL_{17}	—	November 21, 2009	Catalina	CSS	·	3.6 km	MPC · JPL
832648	2010 EV_{18}	—	March 8, 2010	WISE	WISE	·	3.7 km	MPC · JPL
832649	2010 EL_{19}	—	March 5, 2010	WISE	WISE	EUP	2.2 km	MPC · JPL
832650	2010 EZ_{19}	—	December 20, 2009	Mount Lemmon	Mount Lemmon Survey	·	3.4 km	MPC · JPL
832651	2010 EL_{20}	—	January 4, 2010	Kitt Peak	Spacewatch	T_{j} (2.99)	2.5 km	MPC · JPL
832652	2010 EE_{23}	—	March 9, 2010	WISE	WISE	·	1.3 km	MPC · JPL
832653	2010 EQ_{23}	—	March 9, 2010	WISE	WISE	·	2.7 km	MPC · JPL
832654	2010 ER_{23}	—	March 9, 2010	WISE	WISE	·	1.3 km	MPC · JPL
832655	2010 EQ_{24}	—	March 10, 2010	WISE	WISE	·	1.9 km	MPC · JPL
832656	2010 EZ_{24}	—	November 23, 2009	Mount Lemmon	Mount Lemmon Survey	·	2.8 km	MPC · JPL
832657	2010 EA_{25}	—	March 10, 2010	WISE	WISE	T_{j} (2.96)	3.7 km	MPC · JPL
832658	2010 EE_{25}	—	March 10, 2010	WISE	WISE	·	2.4 km	MPC · JPL
832659	2010 EM_{25}	—	March 10, 2010	WISE	WISE	·	2.9 km	MPC · JPL
832660	2010 EC_{26}	—	January 4, 2010	Kitt Peak	Spacewatch	·	1.6 km	MPC · JPL
832661	2010 EF_{26}	—	November 23, 2009	Mount Lemmon	Mount Lemmon Survey	·	3.2 km	MPC · JPL
832662	2010 EK_{27}	—	February 1, 2009	Kitt Peak	Spacewatch	·	3.1 km	MPC · JPL
832663	2010 EF_{28}	—	March 11, 2010	WISE	WISE	·	1.9 km	MPC · JPL
832664	2010 EN_{31}	—	February 15, 2010	Kitt Peak	Spacewatch	·	2.1 km	MPC · JPL
832665	2010 EA_{39}	—	March 9, 2010	La Sagra	OAM	·	1.3 km	MPC · JPL
832666	2010 ES_{40}	—	March 10, 2010	WISE	WISE	PAL	1.4 km	MPC · JPL
832667	2010 EQ_{43}	—	March 12, 2010	Mount Lemmon	Mount Lemmon Survey	AMO	780 m	MPC · JPL
832668	2010 ED_{54}	—	March 12, 2010	WISE	WISE	·	3.5 km	MPC · JPL
832669	2010 EB_{55}	—	March 12, 2010	WISE	WISE	·	2.0 km	MPC · JPL
832670	2010 EC_{56}	—	March 13, 2010	WISE	WISE	LUT	3.8 km	MPC · JPL
832671	2010 EG_{62}	—	March 14, 2010	WISE	WISE	·	1.5 km	MPC · JPL
832672	2010 EM_{65}	—	March 14, 2010	WISE	WISE	T_{j} (2.98) · EUP	3.3 km	MPC · JPL
832673	2010 EY_{65}	—	March 12, 2010	Mount Lemmon	Mount Lemmon Survey	·	2.8 km	MPC · JPL
832674	2010 EQ_{73}	—	March 13, 2010	Mount Lemmon	Mount Lemmon Survey	·	1.5 km	MPC · JPL
832675	2010 ER_{74}	—	February 16, 2010	Kitt Peak	Spacewatch	·	4.4 km	MPC · JPL
832676	2010 ER_{75}	—	January 12, 2010	Kitt Peak	Spacewatch	·	3.4 km	MPC · JPL
832677	2010 ET_{75}	—	October 13, 1999	Sacramento Peak	SDSS	·	1.1 km	MPC · JPL
832678	2010 EV_{76}	—	March 21, 1999	Sacramento Peak	SDSS	·	2.6 km	MPC · JPL
832679	2010 EB_{80}	—	April 9, 1999	Kitt Peak	Spacewatch	·	3.0 km	MPC · JPL
832680	2010 EH_{82}	—	March 12, 2010	Kitt Peak	Spacewatch	·	3.1 km	MPC · JPL
832681	2010 EQ_{82}	—	March 12, 2010	Catalina	CSS	THB	2.6 km	MPC · JPL
832682	2010 ET_{82}	—	March 12, 2010	Catalina	CSS	·	2.1 km	MPC · JPL
832683	2010 ES_{88}	—	February 15, 2010	Mount Lemmon	Mount Lemmon Survey	·	2.8 km	MPC · JPL
832684	2010 EW_{88}	—	March 5, 2010	Kitt Peak	Spacewatch	·	4.1 km	MPC · JPL
832685	2010 ED_{89}	—	February 10, 2010	Kitt Peak	Spacewatch	·	2.5 km	MPC · JPL
832686	2010 EH_{91}	—	March 14, 2010	Mount Lemmon	Mount Lemmon Survey	·	3.0 km	MPC · JPL
832687	2010 EQ_{93}	—	February 15, 2010	Kitt Peak	Spacewatch	·	3.0 km	MPC · JPL
832688	2010 EJ_{111}	—	February 19, 2010	Mount Lemmon	Mount Lemmon Survey	·	2.0 km	MPC · JPL
832689	2010 EW_{113}	—	February 15, 2010	Catalina	CSS	·	2.9 km	MPC · JPL
832690	2010 EX_{113}	—	March 11, 2003	Palomar	NEAT	PHO	710 m	MPC · JPL
832691	2010 EJ_{114}	—	March 11, 2010	WISE	WISE	T_{j} (2.96) · 3:2	4.1 km	MPC · JPL
832692	2010 EY_{114}	—	March 13, 2010	WISE	WISE	·	2.1 km	MPC · JPL
832693	2010 ER_{115}	—	March 14, 2010	WISE	WISE	·	2.5 km	MPC · JPL
832694	2010 EW_{115}	—	March 14, 2010	WISE	WISE	·	2.5 km	MPC · JPL
832695	2010 ER_{116}	—	March 15, 2010	WISE	WISE	LIX	3.7 km	MPC · JPL
832696	2010 EG_{133}	—	March 13, 2010	Mount Lemmon	Mount Lemmon Survey	·	3.7 km	MPC · JPL
832697	2010 ED_{137}	—	December 27, 2009	Kitt Peak	Spacewatch	·	1.8 km	MPC · JPL
832698	2010 EU_{140}	—	March 13, 2010	Kitt Peak	Spacewatch	·	1.7 km	MPC · JPL
832699	2010 EB_{143}	—	January 24, 2003	La Silla	A. Boattini, Hainaut, O.	·	540 m	MPC · JPL
832700	2010 EN_{144}	—	December 17, 2009	Mount Lemmon	Mount Lemmon Survey	·	1.9 km	MPC · JPL

== 832701–832800 ==
back to top

Designation			Discovery			Properties		Ref
Permanent	Provisional	Named after	Date	Site	Discoverer(s)	Category	Diam.	Ref
832701	2010 EX_{144}	—	February 20, 2018	Haleakala	Pan-STARRS 1	·	2.4 km	MPC · JPL
832702	2010 EF_{145}	—	March 1, 2010	WISE	WISE	·	2.3 km	MPC · JPL
832703	2010 EK_{145}	—	September 20, 2009	Kitt Peak	Spacewatch	·	1.5 km	MPC · JPL
832704	2010 EF_{146}	—	June 11, 2010	Kitt Peak	Spacewatch	·	3.1 km	MPC · JPL
832705	2010 EW_{146}	—	November 17, 2009	Kitt Peak	Spacewatch	·	2.2 km	MPC · JPL
832706	2010 EK_{147}	—	March 8, 2010	WISE	WISE	T_{j} (2.97)	2.4 km	MPC · JPL
832707	2010 EW_{147}	—	December 30, 2008	Mount Lemmon	Mount Lemmon Survey	·	2.9 km	MPC · JPL
832708	2010 EA_{148}	—	March 9, 2010	WISE	WISE	·	1.4 km	MPC · JPL
832709	2010 EH_{149}	—	March 9, 2010	WISE	WISE	LUT	3.2 km	MPC · JPL
832710	2010 EL_{149}	—	March 9, 2010	WISE	WISE	·	2.8 km	MPC · JPL
832711	2010 EB_{150}	—	March 10, 2010	WISE	WISE	·	2.6 km	MPC · JPL
832712	2010 ED_{151}	—	July 9, 2015	Haleakala	Pan-STARRS 1	·	2.5 km	MPC · JPL
832713	2010 EP_{151}	—	March 11, 2010	WISE	WISE	·	1.9 km	MPC · JPL
832714	2010 ET_{151}	—	December 16, 2009	Mount Lemmon	Mount Lemmon Survey	·	1.7 km	MPC · JPL
832715	2010 EA_{152}	—	March 11, 2010	WISE	WISE	·	2.7 km	MPC · JPL
832716	2010 EJ_{152}	—	March 11, 2010	WISE	WISE	T_{j} (2.99) · EUP	4.1 km	MPC · JPL
832717	2010 EK_{152}	—	June 19, 2010	Kitt Peak	Spacewatch	·	2.9 km	MPC · JPL
832718	2010 EA_{155}	—	December 15, 2009	Bergisch Gladbach	W. Bickel	·	2.5 km	MPC · JPL
832719	2010 EK_{155}	—	March 12, 2010	WISE	WISE	·	2.0 km	MPC · JPL
832720	2010 ET_{155}	—	March 13, 2010	WISE	WISE	·	2.0 km	MPC · JPL
832721	2010 ED_{156}	—	April 2, 2011	Mount Lemmon	Mount Lemmon Survey	·	2.2 km	MPC · JPL
832722	2010 EH_{156}	—	March 13, 2010	WISE	WISE	·	3.7 km	MPC · JPL
832723	2010 ET_{157}	—	March 13, 2010	WISE	WISE	PHO	1.7 km	MPC · JPL
832724	2010 EZ_{157}	—	March 14, 2010	WISE	WISE	ADE	1.4 km	MPC · JPL
832725	2010 EJ_{159}	—	August 5, 2005	Palomar	NEAT	EUP	2.5 km	MPC · JPL
832726	2010 EC_{160}	—	March 15, 2010	WISE	WISE	(194)	1.2 km	MPC · JPL
832727	2010 EL_{160}	—	March 15, 2010	WISE	WISE	T_{j} (2.98)	3.0 km	MPC · JPL
832728	2010 EP_{160}	—	January 8, 2010	Kitt Peak	Spacewatch	DOR	2.1 km	MPC · JPL
832729	2010 EJ_{162}	—	March 3, 2010	WISE	WISE	·	770 m	MPC · JPL
832730	2010 EV_{162}	—	March 3, 2010	WISE	WISE	·	1.8 km	MPC · JPL
832731	2010 ED_{165}	—	December 17, 2009	Mount Lemmon	Mount Lemmon Survey	ARM	2.8 km	MPC · JPL
832732	2010 EJ_{165}	—	May 21, 2010	Mount Lemmon	Mount Lemmon Survey	·	2.5 km	MPC · JPL
832733	2010 EQ_{166}	—	March 5, 2010	WISE	WISE	·	1.8 km	MPC · JPL
832734	2010 ET_{166}	—	August 26, 2000	Cerro Tololo	Deep Ecliptic Survey	3:2	4.1 km	MPC · JPL
832735	2010 EB_{167}	—	March 5, 2010	WISE	WISE	·	2.2 km	MPC · JPL
832736	2010 EX_{167}	—	March 6, 2010	WISE	WISE	·	3.3 km	MPC · JPL
832737	2010 EW_{168}	—	December 10, 2009	Mount Lemmon	Mount Lemmon Survey	NEM	1.7 km	MPC · JPL
832738	2010 EE_{169}	—	December 13, 2009	Mount Lemmon	Mount Lemmon Survey	HYG	2.6 km	MPC · JPL
832739	2010 EL_{170}	—	March 8, 2010	WISE	WISE	·	2.3 km	MPC · JPL
832740	2010 EN_{170}	—	March 8, 2010	WISE	WISE	·	3.2 km	MPC · JPL
832741	2010 EZ_{170}	—	March 15, 2010	WISE	WISE	·	1.6 km	MPC · JPL
832742	2010 EX_{178}	—	March 19, 2017	Mount Lemmon	Mount Lemmon Survey	·	490 m	MPC · JPL
832743	2010 EG_{190}	—	December 18, 2014	Haleakala	Pan-STARRS 1	·	1.9 km	MPC · JPL
832744	2010 EJ_{190}	—	March 13, 2010	Mount Lemmon	Mount Lemmon Survey	·	2.1 km	MPC · JPL
832745	2010 EH_{192}	—	March 12, 2010	Kitt Peak	Spacewatch	·	980 m	MPC · JPL
832746	2010 EU_{192}	—	March 13, 2010	Mount Lemmon	Mount Lemmon Survey	·	1.2 km	MPC · JPL
832747	2010 FQ_{1}	—	March 16, 2010	Mount Lemmon	Mount Lemmon Survey	·	1.1 km	MPC · JPL
832748	2010 FH_{3}	—	March 21, 1999	Sacramento Peak	SDSS	·	1.3 km	MPC · JPL
832749	2010 FQ_{4}	—	March 16, 2010	Mount Lemmon	Mount Lemmon Survey	·	3.6 km	MPC · JPL
832750	2010 FB_{5}	—	March 16, 2010	Mount Lemmon	Mount Lemmon Survey	(1547)	990 m	MPC · JPL
832751	2010 FJ_{10}	—	March 18, 2010	Mount Lemmon	Mount Lemmon Survey	·	3.3 km	MPC · JPL
832752	2010 FO_{13}	—	March 17, 2010	Kitt Peak	Spacewatch	·	730 m	MPC · JPL
832753	2010 FZ_{19}	—	February 16, 2010	Kitt Peak	Spacewatch	·	2.0 km	MPC · JPL
832754	2010 FN_{22}	—	March 18, 2010	Mount Lemmon	Mount Lemmon Survey	·	2.6 km	MPC · JPL
832755	2010 FQ_{24}	—	April 20, 2006	Kitt Peak	Spacewatch	·	1.1 km	MPC · JPL
832756	2010 FD_{25}	—	September 10, 2007	Kitt Peak	Spacewatch	·	1.9 km	MPC · JPL
832757	2010 FY_{29}	—	March 17, 2010	Kitt Peak	Spacewatch	·	1.1 km	MPC · JPL
832758	2010 FB_{35}	—	November 19, 2003	Kitt Peak	Spacewatch	·	4.5 km	MPC · JPL
832759	2010 FC_{35}	—	March 18, 2010	WISE	WISE	·	2.6 km	MPC · JPL
832760	2010 FF_{35}	—	October 2, 2008	Mount Lemmon	Mount Lemmon Survey	3:2 · SHU	3.6 km	MPC · JPL
832761	2010 FU_{35}	—	March 18, 2010	WISE	WISE	·	2.1 km	MPC · JPL
832762	2010 FV_{35}	—	March 18, 2010	WISE	WISE	EUP	1.9 km	MPC · JPL
832763	2010 FW_{35}	—	March 18, 2010	WISE	WISE	·	2.4 km	MPC · JPL
832764	2010 FX_{35}	—	October 14, 2009	Mount Lemmon	Mount Lemmon Survey	EUP	3.1 km	MPC · JPL
832765	2010 FY_{35}	—	March 18, 2010	WISE	WISE	·	2.6 km	MPC · JPL
832766	2010 FB_{36}	—	March 18, 2010	WISE	WISE	·	2.1 km	MPC · JPL
832767	2010 FY_{36}	—	March 18, 2010	WISE	WISE	·	2.3 km	MPC · JPL
832768	2010 FU_{37}	—	March 18, 2010	WISE	WISE	·	2.6 km	MPC · JPL
832769	2010 FF_{38}	—	March 19, 2010	WISE	WISE	·	2.1 km	MPC · JPL
832770	2010 FG_{39}	—	March 19, 2010	WISE	WISE	·	2.0 km	MPC · JPL
832771	2010 FK_{40}	—	February 21, 2009	Kitt Peak	Spacewatch	·	2.5 km	MPC · JPL
832772	2010 FO_{40}	—	December 19, 2009	Kitt Peak	Spacewatch	·	1.5 km	MPC · JPL
832773	2010 FL_{41}	—	March 20, 2010	WISE	WISE	T_{j} (2.96) · 3:2	3.8 km	MPC · JPL
832774	2010 FQ_{41}	—	March 20, 2010	WISE	WISE	·	3.7 km	MPC · JPL
832775	2010 FY_{42}	—	March 20, 2010	WISE	WISE	PHO	1.5 km	MPC · JPL
832776	2010 FL_{43}	—	March 20, 2010	WISE	WISE	·	3.5 km	MPC · JPL
832777	2010 FC_{44}	—	March 21, 2010	WISE	WISE	·	2.5 km	MPC · JPL
832778	2010 FZ_{44}	—	March 21, 2010	WISE	WISE	LIX	3.9 km	MPC · JPL
832779	2010 FE_{45}	—	March 21, 2010	WISE	WISE	·	4.0 km	MPC · JPL
832780	2010 FQ_{47}	—	March 22, 2010	ESA OGS	ESA OGS	·	2.6 km	MPC · JPL
832781	2010 FZ_{50}	—	March 26, 2010	WISE	WISE	PHO	2.1 km	MPC · JPL
832782	2010 FA_{51}	—	March 26, 2010	WISE	WISE	·	2.1 km	MPC · JPL
832783	2010 FF_{51}	—	March 26, 2010	WISE	WISE	·	2.2 km	MPC · JPL
832784	2010 FE_{52}	—	March 19, 2009	Kitt Peak	Spacewatch	PHO	3.1 km	MPC · JPL
832785	2010 FF_{52}	—	December 20, 2009	Mount Lemmon	Mount Lemmon Survey	EUN	1.9 km	MPC · JPL
832786	2010 FO_{52}	—	September 29, 2008	Mount Lemmon	Mount Lemmon Survey	·	3.3 km	MPC · JPL
832787	2010 FE_{55}	—	March 21, 2010	Mount Lemmon	Mount Lemmon Survey	·	2.9 km	MPC · JPL
832788	2010 FL_{55}	—	October 9, 2007	Kitt Peak	Spacewatch	·	1.9 km	MPC · JPL
832789	2010 FB_{58}	—	March 25, 2010	WISE	WISE	·	3.0 km	MPC · JPL
832790	2010 FG_{58}	—	October 7, 2008	Catalina	CSS	·	4.4 km	MPC · JPL
832791	2010 FD_{59}	—	November 23, 2009	Kitt Peak	Spacewatch	·	1.8 km	MPC · JPL
832792	2010 FS_{60}	—	March 26, 2010	WISE	WISE	·	2.0 km	MPC · JPL
832793	2010 FK_{61}	—	March 26, 2010	WISE	WISE	·	1.9 km	MPC · JPL
832794	2010 FP_{61}	—	March 27, 2010	WISE	WISE	·	3.6 km	MPC · JPL
832795	2010 FX_{62}	—	March 27, 2010	WISE	WISE	(7605)	4.5 km	MPC · JPL
832796	2010 FV_{63}	—	March 28, 2010	WISE	WISE	·	1.7 km	MPC · JPL
832797	2010 FO_{65}	—	February 4, 2006	Kitt Peak	Spacewatch	·	2.4 km	MPC · JPL
832798	2010 FV_{65}	—	December 27, 2009	Kitt Peak	Spacewatch	·	2.6 km	MPC · JPL
832799	2010 FB_{66}	—	March 28, 2010	WISE	WISE	·	2.8 km	MPC · JPL
832800	2010 FJ_{66}	—	January 6, 2010	Mount Lemmon	Mount Lemmon Survey	T_{j} (2.99) · EUP	3.2 km	MPC · JPL

== 832801–832900 ==
back to top

Designation			Discovery			Properties		Ref
Permanent	Provisional	Named after	Date	Site	Discoverer(s)	Category	Diam.	Ref
832801	2010 FN_{66}	—	March 29, 2010	WISE	WISE	·	1.3 km	MPC · JPL
832802	2010 FK_{68}	—	October 6, 2008	Mount Lemmon	Mount Lemmon Survey	·	2.8 km	MPC · JPL
832803	2010 FQ_{68}	—	March 29, 2010	WISE	WISE	·	2.4 km	MPC · JPL
832804	2010 FU_{68}	—	January 8, 2010	Mount Lemmon	Mount Lemmon Survey	·	2.7 km	MPC · JPL
832805	2010 FE_{71}	—	September 25, 2008	Mount Lemmon	Mount Lemmon Survey	·	4.4 km	MPC · JPL
832806	2010 FL_{71}	—	August 30, 2005	Kitt Peak	Spacewatch	LIX	4.4 km	MPC · JPL
832807	2010 FY_{71}	—	January 8, 2010	Mount Lemmon	Mount Lemmon Survey	T_{j} (2.97)	2.0 km	MPC · JPL
832808	2010 FB_{72}	—	March 30, 2010	WISE	WISE	KON	2.2 km	MPC · JPL
832809	2010 FC_{72}	—	March 30, 2010	WISE	WISE	PHO	1.8 km	MPC · JPL
832810	2010 FP_{72}	—	March 30, 2010	WISE	WISE	EUP	3.7 km	MPC · JPL
832811	2010 FZ_{72}	—	March 26, 2010	WISE	WISE	·	3.7 km	MPC · JPL
832812	2010 FO_{73}	—	November 10, 2009	Mount Lemmon	Mount Lemmon Survey	DOR	2.0 km	MPC · JPL
832813	2010 FJ_{75}	—	March 31, 2010	WISE	WISE	·	3.2 km	MPC · JPL
832814	2010 FV_{75}	—	March 31, 2010	WISE	WISE	·	2.0 km	MPC · JPL
832815	2010 FY_{75}	—	January 20, 2009	Mount Lemmon	Mount Lemmon Survey	·	2.9 km	MPC · JPL
832816	2010 FZ_{75}	—	March 31, 2010	WISE	WISE	·	2.0 km	MPC · JPL
832817	2010 FE_{76}	—	September 6, 2008	Mount Lemmon	Mount Lemmon Survey	·	3.4 km	MPC · JPL
832818	2010 FS_{76}	—	March 31, 2010	WISE	WISE	·	2.9 km	MPC · JPL
832819	2010 FE_{78}	—	September 17, 2007	Andrushivka	Y. Ivaščenko	·	3.4 km	MPC · JPL
832820	2010 FQ_{79}	—	March 31, 2010	WISE	WISE	·	1.9 km	MPC · JPL
832821	2010 FW_{79}	—	March 31, 2010	WISE	WISE	·	3.3 km	MPC · JPL
832822	2010 FR_{80}	—	January 8, 2010	Kitt Peak	Spacewatch	·	1.8 km	MPC · JPL
832823	2010 FU_{81}	—	March 26, 2010	WISE	WISE	·	1.8 km	MPC · JPL
832824	2010 FZ_{81}	—	December 17, 2001	Kitt Peak	Deep Lens Survey	·	2.0 km	MPC · JPL
832825	2010 FD_{82}	—	December 27, 2009	Great Shefford	Birtwhistle, P.	·	1.7 km	MPC · JPL
832826	2010 FL_{82}	—	March 29, 2010	WISE	WISE	EUP	1.8 km	MPC · JPL
832827	2010 FH_{86}	—	March 30, 2010	WISE	WISE	·	720 m	MPC · JPL
832828	2010 FL_{86}	—	February 28, 2009	Kitt Peak	Spacewatch	·	3.3 km	MPC · JPL
832829	2010 FP_{86}	—	March 31, 2010	WISE	WISE	·	3.1 km	MPC · JPL
832830	2010 FQ_{86}	—	March 31, 2010	WISE	WISE	·	1.2 km	MPC · JPL
832831	2010 FR_{86}	—	March 31, 2010	WISE	WISE	·	2.6 km	MPC · JPL
832832	2010 FJ_{95}	—	March 18, 2010	Kitt Peak	Spacewatch	·	3.2 km	MPC · JPL
832833	2010 FZ_{95}	—	March 21, 2010	Kitt Peak	Spacewatch	·	1.2 km	MPC · JPL
832834	2010 FL_{97}	—	March 20, 1999	Sacramento Peak	SDSS	·	2.4 km	MPC · JPL
832835	2010 FM_{102}	—	March 16, 2010	WISE	WISE	·	2.9 km	MPC · JPL
832836	2010 FH_{103}	—	March 17, 2010	WISE	WISE	PHO	2.2 km	MPC · JPL
832837	2010 FO_{103}	—	March 17, 2010	WISE	WISE	·	1.4 km	MPC · JPL
832838	2010 FS_{103}	—	March 17, 2010	WISE	WISE	·	1.6 km	MPC · JPL
832839	2010 FZ_{103}	—	May 26, 2020	Mount Lemmon	Mount Lemmon Survey	·	2.1 km	MPC · JPL
832840	2010 FX_{104}	—	March 18, 2010	WISE	WISE	·	3.5 km	MPC · JPL
832841	2010 FH_{105}	—	March 18, 2010	WISE	WISE	·	1.9 km	MPC · JPL
832842	2010 FM_{105}	—	March 18, 2010	WISE	WISE	EUP	3.4 km	MPC · JPL
832843	2010 FX_{105}	—	December 29, 2014	Haleakala	Pan-STARRS 1	·	1.4 km	MPC · JPL
832844	2010 FJ_{106}	—	March 19, 2010	WISE	WISE	·	1.3 km	MPC · JPL
832845	2010 FL_{106}	—	March 19, 2010	WISE	WISE	·	920 m	MPC · JPL
832846	2010 FX_{106}	—	March 19, 2010	WISE	WISE	·	1.9 km	MPC · JPL
832847	2010 FN_{108}	—	March 20, 2010	WISE	WISE	·	3.0 km	MPC · JPL
832848	2010 FQ_{108}	—	November 19, 2008	Mount Lemmon	Mount Lemmon Survey	·	2.4 km	MPC · JPL
832849	2010 FA_{109}	—	December 18, 2009	Kitt Peak	Spacewatch	·	2.5 km	MPC · JPL
832850	2010 FS_{109}	—	March 21, 2010	WISE	WISE	·	2.7 km	MPC · JPL
832851	2010 FM_{110}	—	March 21, 2010	WISE	WISE	·	1.5 km	MPC · JPL
832852	2010 FH_{111}	—	March 22, 2010	WISE	WISE	·	2.2 km	MPC · JPL
832853	2010 FO_{112}	—	January 10, 2010	Mount Lemmon	Mount Lemmon Survey	·	1.6 km	MPC · JPL
832854	2010 FJ_{113}	—	March 26, 2010	WISE	WISE	·	1.2 km	MPC · JPL
832855	2010 FZ_{113}	—	March 26, 2010	WISE	WISE	·	2.8 km	MPC · JPL
832856	2010 FH_{114}	—	March 26, 2010	WISE	WISE	·	1.7 km	MPC · JPL
832857	2010 FP_{114}	—	March 26, 2010	WISE	WISE	PHO	880 m	MPC · JPL
832858	2010 FP_{115}	—	March 27, 2010	WISE	WISE	·	2.2 km	MPC · JPL
832859	2010 FK_{116}	—	March 27, 2010	WISE	WISE	·	1.9 km	MPC · JPL
832860	2010 FS_{117}	—	March 29, 2010	WISE	WISE	·	2.4 km	MPC · JPL
832861	2010 FY_{117}	—	March 29, 2010	WISE	WISE	·	1.9 km	MPC · JPL
832862	2010 FD_{118}	—	March 29, 2010	WISE	WISE	·	2.2 km	MPC · JPL
832863	2010 FQ_{118}	—	March 29, 2010	WISE	WISE	·	1.9 km	MPC · JPL
832864	2010 FY_{118}	—	December 19, 2009	Mount Lemmon	Mount Lemmon Survey	·	2.4 km	MPC · JPL
832865	2010 FZ_{118}	—	March 29, 2010	WISE	WISE	·	2.1 km	MPC · JPL
832866	2010 FF_{119}	—	March 29, 2010	WISE	WISE	·	1.7 km	MPC · JPL
832867	2010 FV_{119}	—	March 30, 2010	WISE	WISE	·	1.7 km	MPC · JPL
832868	2010 FZ_{119}	—	March 30, 2010	WISE	WISE	KON	1.9 km	MPC · JPL
832869	2010 FC_{120}	—	March 30, 2010	WISE	WISE	·	970 m	MPC · JPL
832870	2010 FF_{120}	—	March 30, 2010	WISE	WISE	·	2.7 km	MPC · JPL
832871	2010 FH_{120}	—	March 30, 2010	WISE	WISE	·	1.2 km	MPC · JPL
832872	2010 FV_{120}	—	March 31, 2010	WISE	WISE	·	890 m	MPC · JPL
832873	2010 FB_{121}	—	March 31, 2010	WISE	WISE	·	1.3 km	MPC · JPL
832874	2010 FL_{131}	—	October 21, 2008	Mount Lemmon	Mount Lemmon Survey	3:2	3.2 km	MPC · JPL
832875	2010 FP_{133}	—	April 5, 2014	Haleakala	Pan-STARRS 1	·	1.3 km	MPC · JPL
832876	2010 FX_{137}	—	March 18, 2010	Kitt Peak	Spacewatch	·	3.4 km	MPC · JPL
832877	2010 FF_{139}	—	March 18, 2010	Kitt Peak	Spacewatch	TIR	2.2 km	MPC · JPL
832878	2010 FM_{139}	—	April 18, 1999	Kitt Peak	Spacewatch	EUP	2.5 km	MPC · JPL
832879	2010 FZ_{139}	—	March 20, 2010	Kitt Peak	Spacewatch	·	1.0 km	MPC · JPL
832880	2010 FA_{140}	—	March 21, 2010	Mount Lemmon	Mount Lemmon Survey	·	4.0 km	MPC · JPL
832881	2010 FF_{141}	—	March 19, 2010	Mount Lemmon	Mount Lemmon Survey	·	1.3 km	MPC · JPL
832882	2010 FC_{142}	—	March 18, 2010	Mount Lemmon	Mount Lemmon Survey	·	1.2 km	MPC · JPL
832883	2010 FN_{142}	—	March 23, 2010	Mount Lemmon	Mount Lemmon Survey	3:2	4.6 km	MPC · JPL
832884	2010 FE_{143}	—	March 18, 2010	Mount Lemmon	Mount Lemmon Survey	·	1.3 km	MPC · JPL
832885	2010 FS_{143}	—	March 19, 2010	Kitt Peak	Spacewatch	·	1.5 km	MPC · JPL
832886	2010 GH	—	April 1, 2010	WISE	WISE	L5	7.7 km	MPC · JPL
832887	2010 GN	—	December 26, 2009	Kitt Peak	Spacewatch	·	3.1 km	MPC · JPL
832888	2010 GB_{1}	—	April 1, 2010	WISE	WISE	·	3.7 km	MPC · JPL
832889	2010 GE_{1}	—	November 20, 2003	Kitt Peak	Spacewatch	·	3.5 km	MPC · JPL
832890	2010 GO_{1}	—	April 1, 2010	WISE	WISE	ERI	1 km	MPC · JPL
832891	2010 GT_{1}	—	April 1, 2010	WISE	WISE	THB	2.2 km	MPC · JPL
832892	2010 GZ_{1}	—	April 1, 2010	WISE	WISE	T_{j} (2.96)	1.7 km	MPC · JPL
832893	2010 GL_{2}	—	April 1, 2010	WISE	WISE	·	2.8 km	MPC · JPL
832894	2010 GN_{2}	—	April 1, 2010	WISE	WISE	KON	1.7 km	MPC · JPL
832895	2010 GX_{2}	—	April 1, 2010	WISE	WISE	·	2.6 km	MPC · JPL
832896	2010 GY_{2}	—	April 1, 2010	WISE	WISE	LIX	2.8 km	MPC · JPL
832897	2010 GC_{3}	—	April 1, 2010	WISE	WISE	·	3.6 km	MPC · JPL
832898	2010 GD_{3}	—	April 1, 2010	WISE	WISE	PHO	2.2 km	MPC · JPL
832899	2010 GH_{4}	—	January 17, 2005	Kitt Peak	Spacewatch	·	2.8 km	MPC · JPL
832900	2010 GU_{4}	—	October 14, 2004	Kitt Peak	Spacewatch	·	1.9 km	MPC · JPL

== 832901–833000 ==
back to top

Designation			Discovery			Properties		Ref
Permanent	Provisional	Named after	Date	Site	Discoverer(s)	Category	Diam.	Ref
832901	2010 GH_{5}	—	April 1, 2010	WISE	WISE	EUP	2.4 km	MPC · JPL
832902	2010 GP_{5}	—	April 1, 2010	WISE	WISE	·	3.0 km	MPC · JPL
832903	2010 GQ_{6}	—	April 1, 2010	WISE	WISE	·	3.1 km	MPC · JPL
832904	2010 GW_{6}	—	April 4, 2010	Dauban	C. Rinner, Kugel, F.	·	1.4 km	MPC · JPL
832905	2010 GD_{8}	—	April 1, 2010	WISE	WISE	·	2.8 km	MPC · JPL
832906	2010 GG_{8}	—	April 1, 2010	WISE	WISE	·	3.1 km	MPC · JPL
832907	2010 GC_{9}	—	January 16, 2015	Haleakala	Pan-STARRS 1	·	3.0 km	MPC · JPL
832908	2010 GG_{10}	—	April 2, 2010	WISE	WISE	·	1.5 km	MPC · JPL
832909	2010 GP_{10}	—	March 23, 2006	Mount Lemmon	Mount Lemmon Survey	DOR	1.9 km	MPC · JPL
832910	2010 GL_{12}	—	April 2, 2010	WISE	WISE	KON	2.1 km	MPC · JPL
832911	2010 GX_{12}	—	October 3, 2003	Kitt Peak	Spacewatch	·	3.9 km	MPC · JPL
832912	2010 GH_{13}	—	April 2, 2010	WISE	WISE	EUP	3.2 km	MPC · JPL
832913	2010 GP_{13}	—	April 3, 2010	WISE	WISE	·	2.1 km	MPC · JPL
832914	2010 GE_{14}	—	November 19, 2009	Mount Lemmon	Mount Lemmon Survey	·	1.8 km	MPC · JPL
832915	2010 GH_{14}	—	April 3, 2010	WISE	WISE	·	1.8 km	MPC · JPL
832916	2010 GM_{14}	—	September 6, 2008	Mount Lemmon	Mount Lemmon Survey	·	3.9 km	MPC · JPL
832917	2010 GS_{14}	—	April 3, 2010	WISE	WISE	·	1.5 km	MPC · JPL
832918	2010 GA_{15}	—	April 3, 2010	WISE	WISE	·	2.2 km	MPC · JPL
832919	2010 GH_{15}	—	April 3, 2010	WISE	WISE	·	2.8 km	MPC · JPL
832920	2010 GA_{16}	—	April 3, 2010	WISE	WISE	·	1.6 km	MPC · JPL
832921	2010 GF_{16}	—	January 6, 2010	Mount Lemmon	Mount Lemmon Survey	·	2.0 km	MPC · JPL
832922	2010 GH_{16}	—	October 18, 2003	Kitt Peak	Spacewatch	·	1.8 km	MPC · JPL
832923	2010 GK_{16}	—	April 3, 2010	WISE	WISE	EUP	2.3 km	MPC · JPL
832924	2010 GU_{16}	—	April 3, 2010	WISE	WISE	·	1.7 km	MPC · JPL
832925	2010 GY_{16}	—	October 1, 2008	Mount Lemmon	Mount Lemmon Survey	3:2	4.6 km	MPC · JPL
832926	2010 GM_{17}	—	April 3, 2010	WISE	WISE	T_{j} (2.99) · 3:2 · (6124)	3.5 km	MPC · JPL
832927	2010 GP_{18}	—	October 6, 2008	Mount Lemmon	Mount Lemmon Survey	·	2.4 km	MPC · JPL
832928	2010 GR_{18}	—	April 4, 2010	WISE	WISE	·	3.7 km	MPC · JPL
832929	2010 GT_{18}	—	April 4, 2010	WISE	WISE	·	2.4 km	MPC · JPL
832930	2010 GU_{18}	—	April 4, 2010	WISE	WISE	THB	2.5 km	MPC · JPL
832931	2010 GA_{19}	—	November 25, 2009	Mount Lemmon	Mount Lemmon Survey	·	1.7 km	MPC · JPL
832932	2010 GH_{19}	—	April 4, 2010	WISE	WISE	·	1.6 km	MPC · JPL
832933	2010 GC_{20}	—	April 16, 2007	Catalina	CSS	·	2.4 km	MPC · JPL
832934	2010 GF_{20}	—	April 4, 2010	WISE	WISE	·	2.9 km	MPC · JPL
832935	2010 GQ_{20}	—	April 4, 2010	WISE	WISE	·	2.7 km	MPC · JPL
832936	2010 GU_{20}	—	April 4, 2010	WISE	WISE	·	3.1 km	MPC · JPL
832937	2010 GX_{20}	—	April 4, 2010	WISE	WISE	PHO	2.9 km	MPC · JPL
832938	2010 GJ_{21}	—	April 1, 2010	WISE	WISE	·	1.8 km	MPC · JPL
832939	2010 GF_{22}	—	April 2, 2010	WISE	WISE	·	2.4 km	MPC · JPL
832940	2010 GR_{22}	—	December 18, 2009	Mount Lemmon	Mount Lemmon Survey	·	1.6 km	MPC · JPL
832941	2010 GT_{22}	—	April 3, 2010	WISE	WISE	·	1.3 km	MPC · JPL
832942	2010 GU_{22}	—	April 3, 2010	WISE	WISE	T_{j} (2.99)	2.5 km	MPC · JPL
832943	2010 GD_{23}	—	April 4, 2010	WISE	WISE	T_{j} (2.99)	2.4 km	MPC · JPL
832944	2010 GF_{23}	—	April 4, 2010	WISE	WISE	·	1.5 km	MPC · JPL
832945	2010 GG_{23}	—	April 4, 2010	WISE	WISE	·	1.7 km	MPC · JPL
832946	2010 GU_{26}	—	December 2, 2008	Mount Lemmon	Mount Lemmon Survey	·	1.6 km	MPC · JPL
832947	2010 GC_{36}	—	November 20, 2009	Mount Lemmon	Mount Lemmon Survey	·	1.4 km	MPC · JPL
832948	2010 GQ_{36}	—	April 5, 2010	WISE	WISE	·	1.4 km	MPC · JPL
832949	2010 GS_{36}	—	July 29, 2002	Palomar	NEAT	·	4.5 km	MPC · JPL
832950	2010 GB_{37}	—	January 6, 2010	Mount Lemmon	Mount Lemmon Survey	·	3.3 km	MPC · JPL
832951	2010 GK_{37}	—	April 5, 2010	WISE	WISE	·	3.0 km	MPC · JPL
832952	2010 GX_{37}	—	April 5, 2010	WISE	WISE	·	2.6 km	MPC · JPL
832953	2010 GZ_{37}	—	April 6, 2010	WISE	WISE	·	920 m	MPC · JPL
832954	2010 GP_{39}	—	April 6, 2010	WISE	WISE	EOS	1.5 km	MPC · JPL
832955	2010 GD_{41}	—	April 7, 2010	WISE	WISE	ELF	3.5 km	MPC · JPL
832956	2010 GF_{41}	—	April 7, 2010	WISE	WISE	·	2.9 km	MPC · JPL
832957	2010 GR_{41}	—	January 12, 2010	Mount Lemmon	Mount Lemmon Survey	·	2.5 km	MPC · JPL
832958	2010 GN_{42}	—	December 19, 2004	Mount Lemmon	Mount Lemmon Survey	EUP	2.8 km	MPC · JPL
832959	2010 GO_{42}	—	December 26, 2009	Kitt Peak	Spacewatch	·	3.2 km	MPC · JPL
832960	2010 GH_{45}	—	September 5, 2000	Sacramento Peak	SDSS	L5	10 km	MPC · JPL
832961	2010 GL_{45}	—	January 12, 2010	Mount Lemmon	Mount Lemmon Survey	·	2.8 km	MPC · JPL
832962	2010 GF_{46}	—	October 29, 2002	Sacramento Peak	SDSS	·	3.9 km	MPC · JPL
832963	2010 GJ_{47}	—	December 15, 2001	Sacramento Peak	SDSS	·	4.7 km	MPC · JPL
832964	2010 GZ_{47}	—	April 8, 2010	WISE	WISE	·	3.1 km	MPC · JPL
832965	2010 GO_{48}	—	April 8, 2010	WISE	WISE	·	1.1 km	MPC · JPL
832966	2010 GP_{49}	—	April 8, 2010	WISE	WISE	T_{j} (2.81)	4.9 km	MPC · JPL
832967	2010 GR_{49}	—	January 13, 2010	Mount Lemmon	Mount Lemmon Survey	·	2.4 km	MPC · JPL
832968	2010 GV_{49}	—	April 8, 2010	WISE	WISE	·	2.8 km	MPC · JPL
832969	2010 GF_{50}	—	March 16, 2004	Kitt Peak	Spacewatch	·	1.9 km	MPC · JPL
832970	2010 GS_{50}	—	April 9, 2010	WISE	WISE	·	2.0 km	MPC · JPL
832971	2010 GN_{51}	—	April 9, 2010	WISE	WISE	·	2.0 km	MPC · JPL
832972	2010 GQ_{51}	—	April 9, 2010	WISE	WISE	·	2.4 km	MPC · JPL
832973	2010 GV_{51}	—	April 9, 2010	WISE	WISE	·	1.8 km	MPC · JPL
832974	2010 GH_{52}	—	April 9, 2010	WISE	WISE	L5	9.4 km	MPC · JPL
832975	2010 GT_{52}	—	March 3, 2009	Kitt Peak	Spacewatch	·	2.2 km	MPC · JPL
832976	2010 GO_{53}	—	April 9, 2010	WISE	WISE	·	3.7 km	MPC · JPL
832977	2010 GD_{54}	—	December 27, 2009	Kitt Peak	Spacewatch	·	4.7 km	MPC · JPL
832978	2010 GO_{54}	—	October 17, 2003	Kitt Peak	Spacewatch	·	3.6 km	MPC · JPL
832979	2010 GM_{55}	—	April 10, 2010	WISE	WISE	LUT	3.2 km	MPC · JPL
832980	2010 GW_{55}	—	April 10, 2010	WISE	WISE	·	4.3 km	MPC · JPL
832981	2010 GA_{56}	—	April 10, 2010	WISE	WISE	·	3.6 km	MPC · JPL
832982	2010 GC_{56}	—	April 10, 2010	WISE	WISE	KON	2.5 km	MPC · JPL
832983	2010 GL_{56}	—	February 20, 2006	Kitt Peak	Spacewatch	·	2.0 km	MPC · JPL
832984	2010 GP_{56}	—	April 10, 2010	WISE	WISE	T_{j} (2.98) · (895)	3.7 km	MPC · JPL
832985	2010 GA_{57}	—	December 20, 2009	Kitt Peak	Spacewatch	T_{j} (2.96)	2.8 km	MPC · JPL
832986	2010 GG_{57}	—	April 10, 2010	WISE	WISE	L5	7.3 km	MPC · JPL
832987	2010 GK_{57}	—	April 10, 2010	WISE	WISE	·	1.4 km	MPC · JPL
832988	2010 GS_{57}	—	December 26, 2009	Kitt Peak	Spacewatch	·	2.2 km	MPC · JPL
832989	2010 GJ_{58}	—	April 10, 2010	WISE	WISE	·	1.8 km	MPC · JPL
832990	2010 GE_{59}	—	April 10, 2010	WISE	WISE	DOR	2.2 km	MPC · JPL
832991	2010 GF_{60}	—	April 6, 2010	WISE	WISE	·	3.1 km	MPC · JPL
832992	2010 GH_{61}	—	April 6, 2010	WISE	WISE	·	1.1 km	MPC · JPL
832993	2010 GJ_{62}	—	April 9, 2010	WISE	WISE	·	1.2 km	MPC · JPL
832994	2010 GW_{62}	—	April 9, 2010	WISE	WISE	APO	280 m	MPC · JPL
832995	2010 GC_{63}	—	December 18, 2009	Mount Lemmon	Mount Lemmon Survey	ADE	2.3 km	MPC · JPL
832996	2010 GO_{64}	—	January 31, 2009	Mount Lemmon	Mount Lemmon Survey	LIX	2.8 km	MPC · JPL
832997	2010 GX_{66}	—	April 10, 2010	Vail	Observatory, Jarnac	·	2.3 km	MPC · JPL
832998	2010 GS_{67}	—	April 10, 2010	WISE	WISE	L5	8.7 km	MPC · JPL
832999	2010 GE_{68}	—	April 11, 2010	WISE	WISE	·	2.2 km	MPC · JPL
833000	2010 GO_{68}	—	November 27, 2009	Mount Lemmon	Mount Lemmon Survey	·	3.5 km	MPC · JPL

back to top
