= 5222 Ioffe =

Main-belt asteroid

- Rotating frame animation in reference to Jupiter. Each frame 81 years.

Discovery
- Discovered by: N. S. Chernykh
- Discovery site: Crimean Astrophysical Obs.
- Discovery date: 11 October 1980

Designations
- Named after: Abram Ioffe (Soviet physicist)
- Alternative designations: 1980 TL_{13} · 1978 LP; 1989 TG_{1}
- Minor planet category: main-belt · (middle); Pallas

Orbital characteristics
- Epoch 16 February 2017 (JD 2457800.5)
- Uncertainty parameter 0
- Observation arc: 64.08 yr (23,405 days)
- Aphelion: 3.1728 AU
- Perihelion: 2.3788 AU
- Semi-major axis: 2.7758 AU
- Eccentricity: 0.1430
- Orbital period (sidereal): 4.62 yr (1,689 days)
- Mean anomaly: 172.25°
- Mean motion: 0° 12^{m} 47.16^{s} / day
- Inclination: 34.539°
- Longitude of ascending node: 220.66°
- Argument of perihelion: 331.02°

Physical characteristics
- Dimensions: 17.989±0.093 km 21.73 km
- Synodic rotation period: 19.4 h
- Geometric albedo: 0.1031; 0.1463±0.012; 0.202±0.041
- Spectral type: B (SMASSII)
- Absolute magnitude (H): 11.4

5222 Ioffe, provisional designation 1980 TL_{13}, is a rare-type carbonaceous Palladian asteroid from the central region of the asteroid belt, approximately 18 kilometers in diameter. It was discovered on 11 October 1980, by Soviet astronomer Nikolai Chernykh at the Crimean Astrophysical Observatory in Nauchnyj, Crimea. It is the largest of the Palladian asteroids apart from Pallas itself.

== Classification and orbit ==
Rotating frame animation in reference to Pallas, showing how Ioffe is in the group with the obvious 1:1 resonance.

Ioffe is a member of the Pallas family (801), a small, carbonaceous asteroid family in the central main-belt.

It orbits the Sun at a distance of 2.4–3.2 AU once every 4 years and 7 months (1,689 days). Its orbit has an eccentricity of 0.14 and an inclination of 35° with respect to the ecliptic. A first precovery was taken at Palomar Observatory in 1952, extending the asteroid's observation arc by 28 years prior to its official discovery observation at Nauchnyj.

== Physical characteristics ==
In the SMASS classification Ioffe is a carbonaceous B-type asteroid, in line with the overall spectral type of the Palladian asteroids.

Photometric observations of this asteroid collected during 2006 show a rotation period of 19.4 ± 0.2 hours with a brightness variation of 0.27 ± 0.03 magnitude.

== Naming ==
This minor planet was named in memory of Soviet physicist Abram Ioffe (1880–1960), an expert in electromagnetism, radiology, crystals, high-impact physics, thermoelectricity and photoelectricity. Ioffe was a pioneer in the investigation of semiconductors. Proposed by the Institute of Theoretical Astronomy, naming citation was published on 5 March 1996 (M.P.C. 26763).
