= Pallas family =

Asteroid family

The Pallas family (adj. Palladian; FIN: 801) is a small asteroid family of B-type asteroids at very high inclinations in the intermediate asteroid belt. The family was identified by Kiyotsugu Hirayama in 1928.

The namesake of the family is 2 Pallas, an extremely large asteroid with a mean diameter of about 512 km. The remaining Palladian asteroids are far smaller; the largest is 5222 Ioffe with an estimated diameter of 22 km. This, along with the preponderance of the otherwise rare B spectral type among its members, indicates that this is likely a cratering family composed of ejecta from impacts on Pallas.

Another suspected Palladian is 3200 Phaethon, the parent body of the Geminid meteor shower.

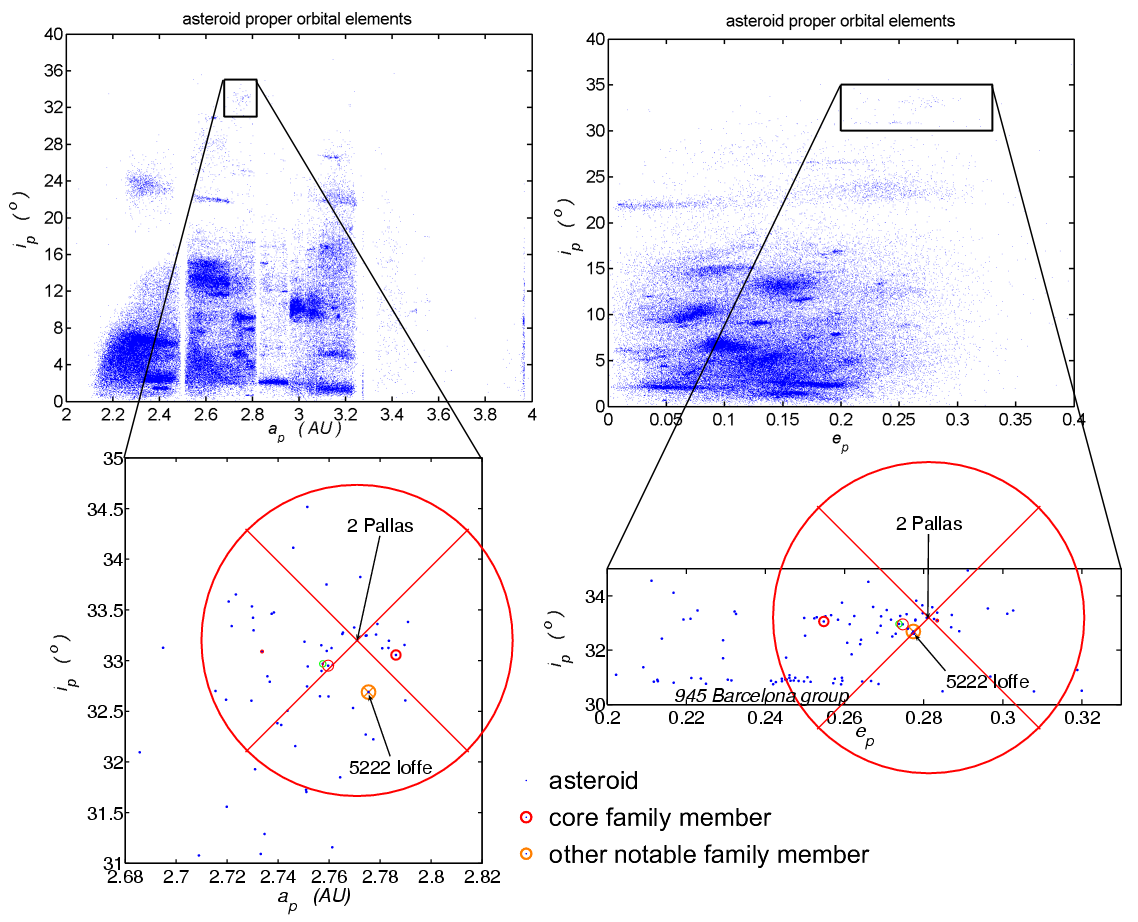
Location and structure of the Pallas family.

From the diagram, their proper orbital elements lie in the approximate ranges

	a_{p}	e_{p}	i_{p}
min	2.71 AU	0.25	32°
max	2.79 AU	0.31	34°

At the present epoch, the range of osculating orbital elements of the members (by comparison to the MPCORB database ) is about

	a	e	i
min	2.71 AU	0.13	30°
max	2.79 AU	0.37	38°
