= Yaroslavtsev =

Yaroslavtsev is a Russian surname. Notable people with the surname include:

- Grigory Yaroslavtsev (born 1987), Russian computer scientist
- Yevgeni Yaroslavtsev (born 1982), Russian footballer

== See also ==
- Yaroslavtsev Log
