= Grigory Yaroslavtsev =

Russian computer scientist

- Born: 1987 (age 38–39); Leningrad
- Education: St. Petersburg Polytechnic University (B.S.); St. Petersburg Academic University of the RAS (M.S.); Pennsylvania State University (PhD)
- Scientific career
- Workplaces: George Mason University; Indiana University; Alan Turing Institute
- Doctoral advisor: Sofya Raskhodnikova
- Notable students: Dmitrii Avdiukhin

Grigory Yaroslavtsev is a Russian-American computer scientist. He was an assistant professor of computer science at George Mason University and a visiting faculty at Stanford University. Previously he was an assistant professor of computer science at Indiana University and the founding director of the Center for Algorithms and Machine Learning (CAML) at Indiana University. Yaroslavtsev is best known for his work on representation learning and optimization in AI, massively parallel computing and algorithms for big data, clustering analysis including correlation clustering, and privacy in network analysis and targeted search.

== Early education ==
Yaroslavtsev was born in St. Petersburg, then Leningrad, in 1987. Through 2002, Yaroslavtsev attended the St. Petersburg Classical Gymnasium, a gymnasium focused on the classics with core subjects of Latin and Ancient Greek, English, German, and mathematics. Yaroslavtsev next attended Physics and Technology School in St. Petersburg, a high school founded by Zhores Alferov, the recipient of the 2000 Nobel Prize in Physics. There he was supported by a Siemens Fellowship and graduated in 2004.

Yaroslavtsev entered the Physics and Technology Department at St. Petersburg Polytechnic University with the first result on the entry exam, and completed his B.S. in 2008. In 2010, Yaroslavtsev received his M.S. from St. Petersburg Academic University of the Russian Academy of Sciences as the first student in a theoretical computer science pilot program. The pilot program was founded by faculty at the St. Petersburg Department of Steklov Institute of Mathematics of Russian Academy of Sciences. Yaroslavtsev's masters thesis was supervised by Edward Hirsch, the Acting Head of the Laboratory of Mathematical Logic at the Steklov Institute.

== Competitive programming ==
Yaroslavtsev was active through 2011 in international programming competitions. He was the only competitor representing the United States among the 24 world finalists in the 2010 TopCoder Open algorithms competition in Las Vegas and is a member of the TCO hall of fame. Yaroslavtsev helped prepare Team USA for the International Olympiad in Informatics in 2011 and coached the high school team of the Physics and Technology School in 2009, when the team placed first in St. Petersburg.

== Career ==
Yaroslavtsev completed his Ph.D. in computer science in three years in 2013 at Pennsylvania State University, advised by Sofya Raskhodnikova. During his Ph.D. he interned at the Database Theory Group of AT&T Labs, Shannon Laboratory and the Theory Groups of IBM Research Almaden, Microsoft Research Silicon Valley and Microsoft Research Redmond. His dissertation was titled Efficient Combinatorial Techniques in Sparsification, Summarization and Testing of Large Datasets. His research received the Best Graduate Research Award at the CSE Department. After an ICERM institute postdoctoral fellowship at Brown University, he joined the University of Pennsylvania (Department of Computer and Information Sciences and Department of Statistics at the Wharton School) in the first cohort of fellows at the Warren Center for Network and Data Science, founded by Michael Kearns.

In 2016, Yaroslavtsev joined the faculty at Indiana University in the Department of Computer Science and founded the Center for Algorithms and Machine Learning (CAML). He held a secondary appointment in the Department of Statistics at Indiana University. He received the Facebook Faculty Research Award in 2017. Yaroslavtsev held a visiting position at the Alan Turing Institute in 2019. In 2021, he joined the faculty at George Mason University in the Department of Computer Science. In 2023-2024 he held a visiting faculty position at the Department of Computer Science at Stanford University.

=== Other work ===
Yaroslavtsev led the development of AI at Lunchclub in 2020-2021. He created AI which connected >1M people for 1-1 professional meetings and pioneered the use of LLM for professional networking.

== Personal life ==
Yaroslavtsev is married to Katherine Roelofs. He is a competitive age-group triathlete, representing Team USA in the 2019 ITU Long Distance Triathlon World Championships.
