= Nika Award for Best Contribution to the Cinematic Science, Criticism and Education =

Russian film award

- Country: Russia
- Presented by: Russian Academy of Cinema Arts and Science
- First award: 2002
- Website: Official site of the Russian Academy of Cinema Arts and Science

The Nika Award for Best Contribution to the Cinematic Science, Criticism and Education (Russian: Ника за вклад в кинематографические науки, критику и образование) is given annually by the Russian Academy of Cinema Arts and Science and presented at the Nika Awards. The following are the recipients of the Cinematic Science, Criticism and Education Award since its inception in 2002.

In 2022, nominees were announced, but the Award ceremony was postponed and, eventually, cancelled.

The Award ceremony was also cancelled in 2023.

== Recipients ==
=== 2000s ===
Year	Recipient	Category	Ref(s)
2002	Sergey Komarov	Film critic	
2003	Viktor Komar	Technical professor	
2004	Mark Zark	Film critic	
2005	Vadim Yusov	Professor at the Gerasimov Institute of Cinematography	
2006	Neya Zorkaya	Film critic and historian of cinema	
2007	Aleksandr Belousov	Engineer and rector at the Saint Petersburg State Institute of Film and Television	
2008	Maya Turovskaya	Film critic and historian of cinema	
2009	Yuri Bogomov	Film critic and historian of cinema	

=== 2010s ===
Year	Recipient	Category	Ref(s)
2011	Armen Medvedev	film critic and historian of cinema	
2013	Vladimir Dmitriev	Official head of Gosfilmofond	
2014	Gerasimov Institute of Cinematography	Film school	
2015	Naum Kleiman	Historian of cinema, film critic and specialist in Sergei Eisenstein	
2016	Daniil Dondurey	Chief editor of the Iskusstvo Kino magazine	
2017	Andrei Plakhov	film critic and historian of cinema	
2018	Saint Petersburg State Institute of Film and Television	Film school	
2019	Irina Rubanova	Film critic	

=== 2020s ===
Year	Recipient	Category	Ref(s)
2021	Elena Stishova	Film critic	
