= Veronika Dolina =

Soviet-Russian singer (born 1956)

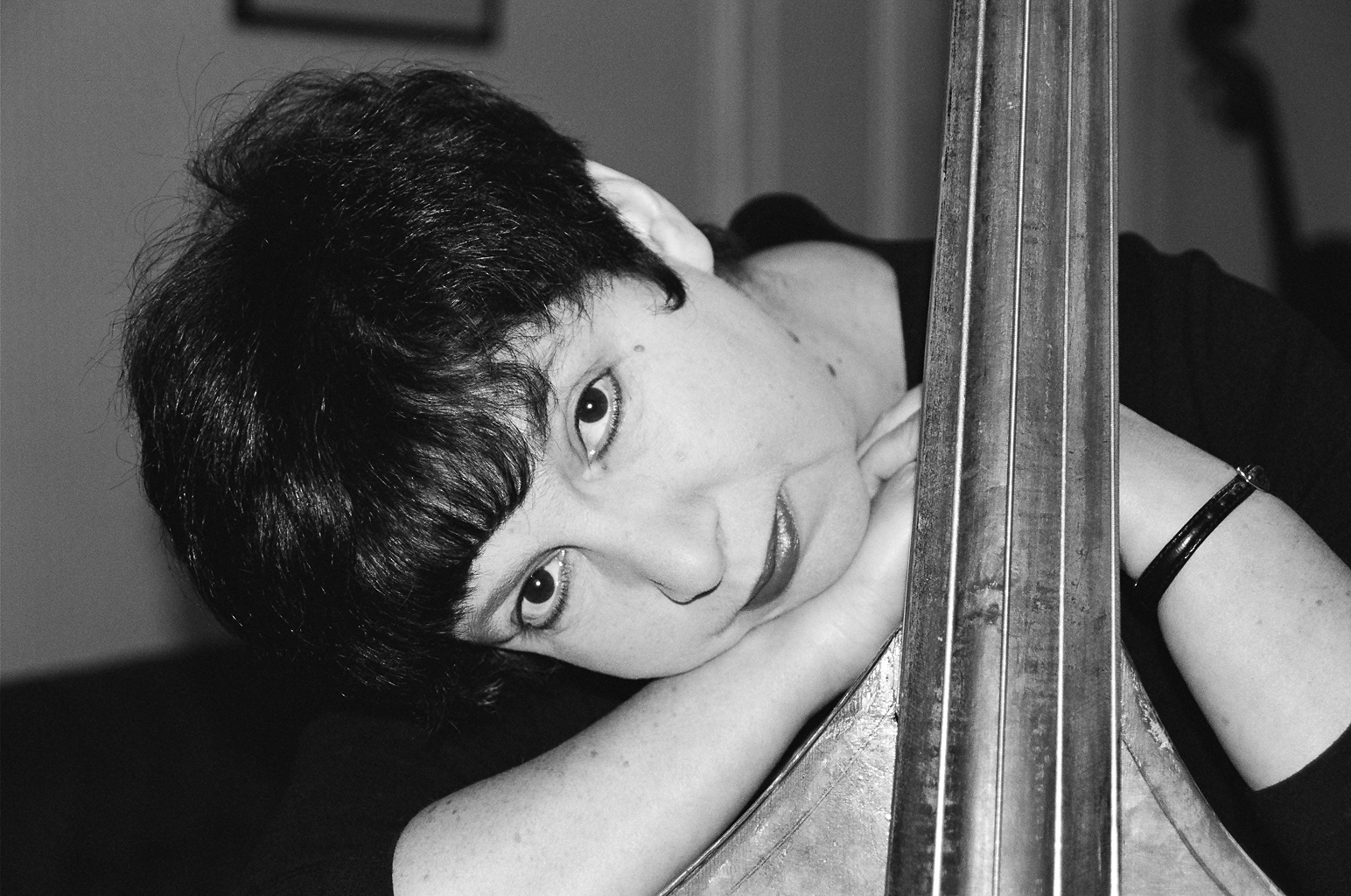
Veronika Dolina, 2004

Veronika Arkadyevna Dolina (Russian: Верони́ка Арка́дьевна До́лина, IPA: [vʲɪrɐˈnʲikə ɐrˈkadʲjɪvnə ˈdolʲɪnə]; born on January 2, 1956) is a Soviet and Russian poet, bard, and songwriter. She is the mother of Russian film critic Anton Dolin.

Veronika Dolina was born in Moscow. Her father was Arkady Fisher, an aircraft designer, her mother was a doctor, Candidate of Medical Sciences, Ludmila Dolina. Her maternal grandfather was neurophysiologist Aleksander Dolin. In 1979, she graduated from the Moscow State Pedagogical Institute as a French language teacher.

Dolina started to write songs and perform them in 1971. She wrote the poetry for most of her songs, but she also had songs that set the poems of Yunna Morits to music, as well as some songs which were written in cooperation with Alexander Sukhanov. Dolina's first record was released in 1986. In 1987, Dolina became a member of the Moscow drama committee. That same year, the first book with Dolina's poetry was published in Paris.

In 1988, she visited Warsaw, Poland for the first time, together with other Russian bards, giving a concert in Hybrydy concert hall, and was applauded for her interpretations. She performed several songs, including "My house is flying", 'There was another Widow', and many more.
