= Georgy Darakhvelidze =

Russian film critic and film historian

- Георгий Дарахвелидзе
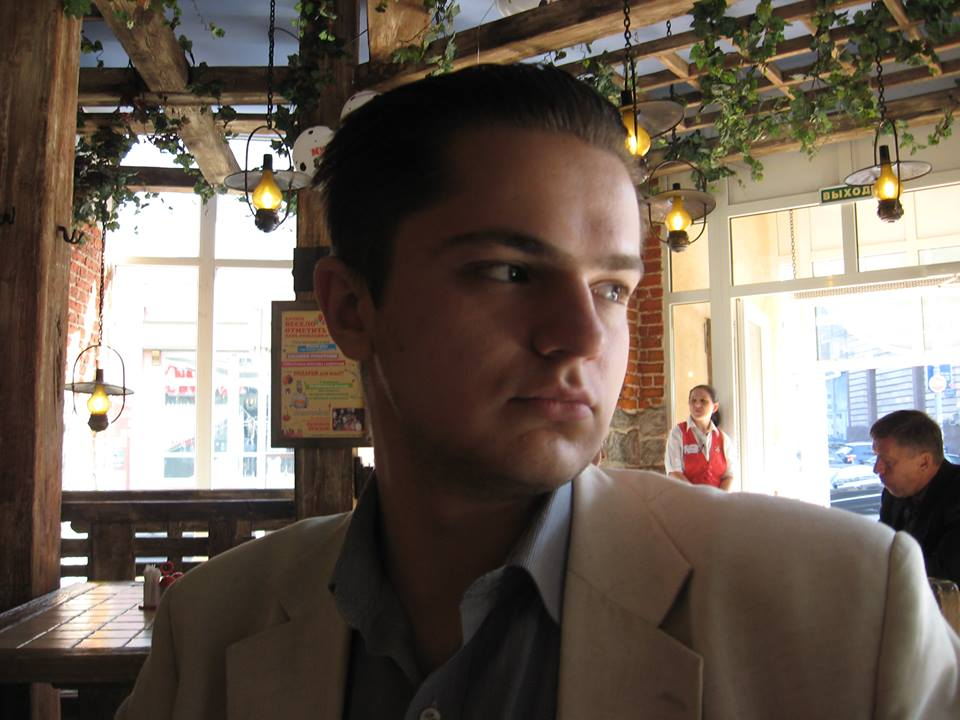
- Born: Georgy Yurievich Darakhvelidze; 7 February 1985 (age 41); Volgodonsk, Rostov Oblast, RSFSR, USSR
- Education: VGIK
- Occupations: Film critic, film historian
- Years active: 2000–present
- Parent(s): Yuri Darakhvelidze; Irina Minkovskaya
- Awards: Russian Guild of Film Critics Award (2008)

Georgy Yurievich Darakhvelidze (Russian: Гео́ргий Ю́рьевич Дарахвели́дзе; born 7 February 1985) is a Russian film critic and film historian. Author of fifteen monographs on film art, including the 7-volume work Landscapes of Dreams. Cinematography by Michael Powell and Emeric Pressburger.

Former columnist for cinema publications in Kinovedcheskiye Zapiski, Iskusstvo Kino, from 2002 to 2004 — Film.ru.
