= Seans =

Russian film magazine

- Editor: Vasily Stepanov
- Categories: Film magazine
- Frequency: four times a year
- Founded: 1989; 37 years ago
- Country: Russia
- Based in: St. Petersburg
- Language: Russian
- Website: seance.ru
- ISSN: 0136-0108
- OCLC: 1010687340

Seans (Russian: Сеанс, meaning Seance in English) is a film magazine published in St. Petersburg, Russia. It has been published since 1989, in 1993 the publishing house of the same name was established. By 2022, more than 100 books have been released by Seanse. The magazine is widely acclaimed as the best blueprint on cinema in Russia.

== History and profile ==
The magazine was created in 1989 by the Russian director Lubov Arcus with the support of Alexander Golutva, director of the Lenfilm.

The first issue was released in May 1990. Since 1994, Seans begins publishing, and since 1997 — research activities. The publication of the magazine was suspended for 6 years and resumed in 2004.

In parallel with the print version in the format of thick black-and-white themed double numbers, Seans exists online: Seance.ru is a daily portal about cinema and culture. As an addition to the site and the printed number, since 2012, the publication of the magazine has been actively developing in social networks.

The articles in the journal are devoted to current events in Russian and world cinema, and through their interpretation in modern society and culture. According to a popular joke in Russian media world, "Iskusstvo Kino is the main Russian magazine about cinema, while Seans is the best".

In 1993, the journal founded the Seans publishing house, which publishes collections of scenarios (the Screenwriter’s Library series), monographs about directors, and books about cinema. Sokurov, a collection of creative materials and critical articles dedicated to the works of director Alexander Sokurov, became their first book, released in 1994. From 2004 to 2014, Seance Publishing House published more than fifty books on cinema, art and history. By 2020, the number of releases exceeded a hundred.

The magazine quickly established itself as a serious edition of art criticism. Summing up the last decade of the 20th century, Dmitry Bykov called Seans the main blueprints of the 90s and described the position of its authors as purely aesthetic, since for them life is only an art theme and exists in their minds only to that extent, in which this art is captured.

In September 2014, Seans together with CoolConnections organized the first Wes Anderson's Retrospective in Russia in the framework of the Amphest Film Festival, which was held in five cities.

In 2020, Arcus resigned after a defamation scandal in Facebook. Her long time colleague Vasily Stepanov took over the editor-in-chief post. Her colleagues, including Anton Dolin of Iskusstvo Kino, voiced support to Arcus and condemned a campaign in social networks that threatened to hazard her life-long projects.

== The editors ==
- Lubov Arcus (1989—2020)
- Vasily Stepanov (since 2020)

== See also ==
- List of film periodicals
