= Arkus =

Arkus is a surname. Notable people with the surname include:

- Lyubov Arkus (born 1960), Russian film director
- Zora Arkus-Duntov (1909–1996, Russian and American engineer
