= Anton Dolin (film critic) =

Russian film critic and journalist

- Антон Долин
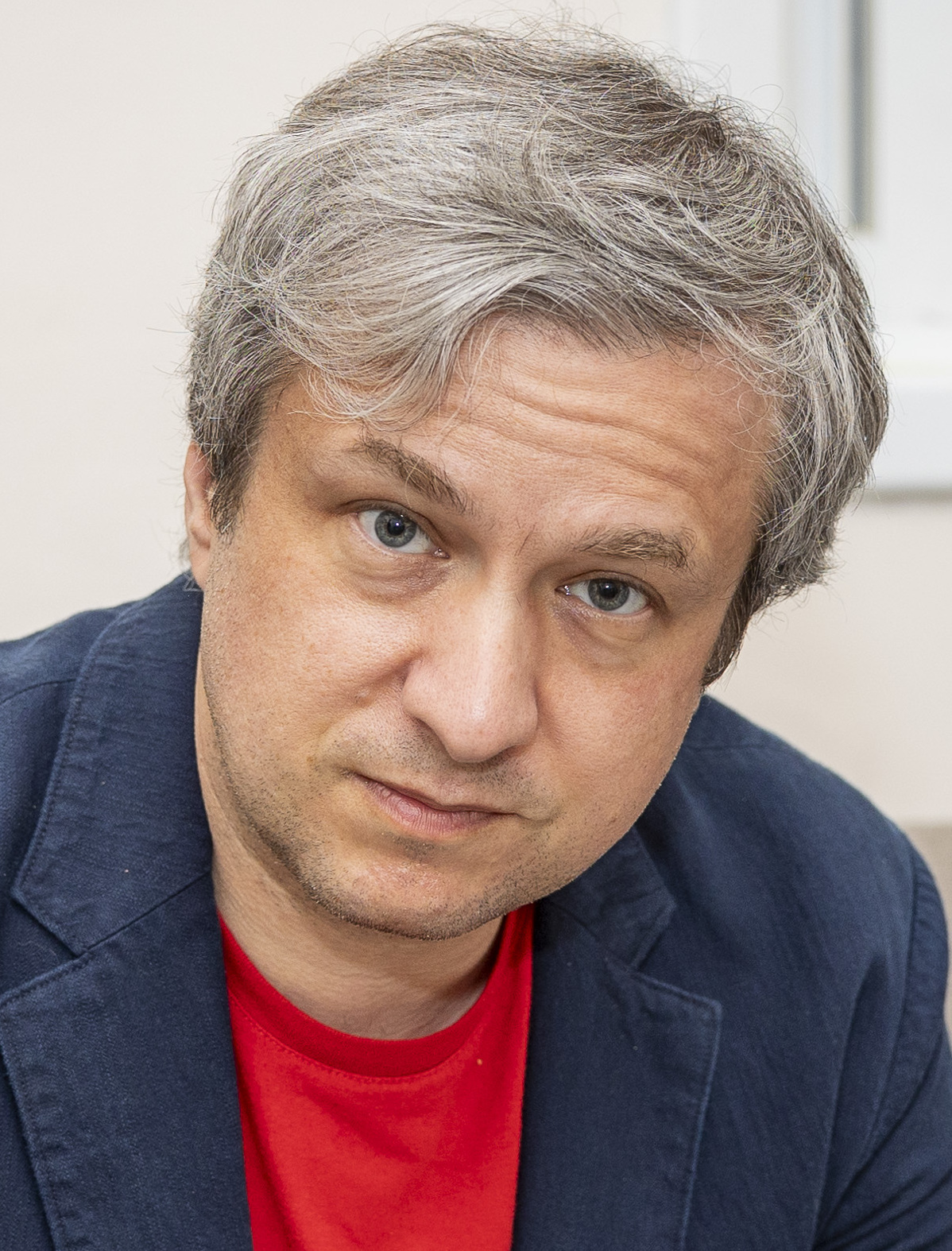
- Dolin in 2024
- Born: Anton Vladimirovich Vorobyov; 23 January 1976 (age 50); Moscow, RSFSR, Soviet Union
- Citizenship: Russia; Israel; Moldova
- Education: Lomonosov Moscow State University (Faculty of Philology, 1997)
- Occupations: Film critic; journalist; radio host; editor; podcaster; blogger
- Years active: 1997–present
- Relatives: Veronika Dolina (mother)
- Awards: GQ Award in the category "Author of the Year" (2019), Award of the Russian Guild of Film Critics (2004, 2011)

Anton Vladimirovich Dolin (né Vorobyov; Russian: Антон Владимирович Долин né Воробьёв; born 23 January 1976) is a Russian film critic, journalist, radio host, blogger and podcaster. He was the chief editor of the Iskusstvo Kino magazine from 2017 to 2022 and the regular film reviewer of Evening Urgant from 2012 to 2020.

He is also a member of the Hollywood Foreign Press Association and a voter for the Golden Globes.

== Biography ==
Anton Dolin is a son of a Soviet poet Veronika Dolina and professor of physics Vladimir Vorobyov. He graduated from Lomonosov Moscow State University (Faculty of Philology) in 1997 as a teacher of Russian literature. In 2000, he graduated from the doctoral program of Gorky Institute of World Literature, writing a dissertation for the degree of Candidate of Philological Sciences on "The history of the Soviet fairy-tale novel", which he did not end up defending.

He worked as a host for the Echo of Moscow from 1997 to 2003. Dolin worked for Radio Mayak from 2007 to 2019. From 2007 to 2010, he was the host of a three-hour daytime show (co-hosted by Tutta Larsen). From 2010 to 2012, he was the reviewer for the Movie Releases with Anton Dolin segment on the daytime show of Anton Komolov and Olga Shelest. From 2012 to 2013, he hosted a three-hour daytime show (co-hosted by Anastasia Drapeko). From 2013 to 2019, he was the host of the radio program The Collection of Words and a film reviewer on the Polkino show. He also hosted the podcast The Viewer's Companion with Anton Dolin. In 2013-2014, he was one of the hosts of the project on the Mayak station and the "Kinopoisk" website — "Top 10 Movies About..." (together with Evgeny Stakhovsky and Vera Kuzmina).

He has also worked for such newspapers and magazines as Moskovskiye Novosti (2006–2007), Expert (2006–2013), The New Times (2008–2017), Vedomosti (2011–2014), Gazeta.Ru (2012–2013), Afisha (2013–2017), and Meduza (since 2017). He was the regular film reviewer of the Vesti FM from 2010 to 2019, and then of the Silver Rain Radio. In 2012 Dolin joined the staff of the Evening Urgant late-night show as a host of the film review section. In 2020, he was fired from Channel One for publishing a negative review on Andrei Kravchuk's Union of Salvation for Meduza.

In 2017 Anton Dolin became the editor-in-chief of the Iskusstvo Kino film magazine. In early March 2022, he announced that he had left the country. After that, Stanislav Dedinsky was appointed acting editor-in-chief. On March 16, 2022, Dolin announced that he was no longer the editor-in-chief of the magazine.

In 2021 he started his own YouTube channel Radio Dolin, supported by Meduza. He is the co-host of Galina Yuzefovich's podcast Book bazaar (Russian: Книжный базар, Knizhny bazar) since 2021.

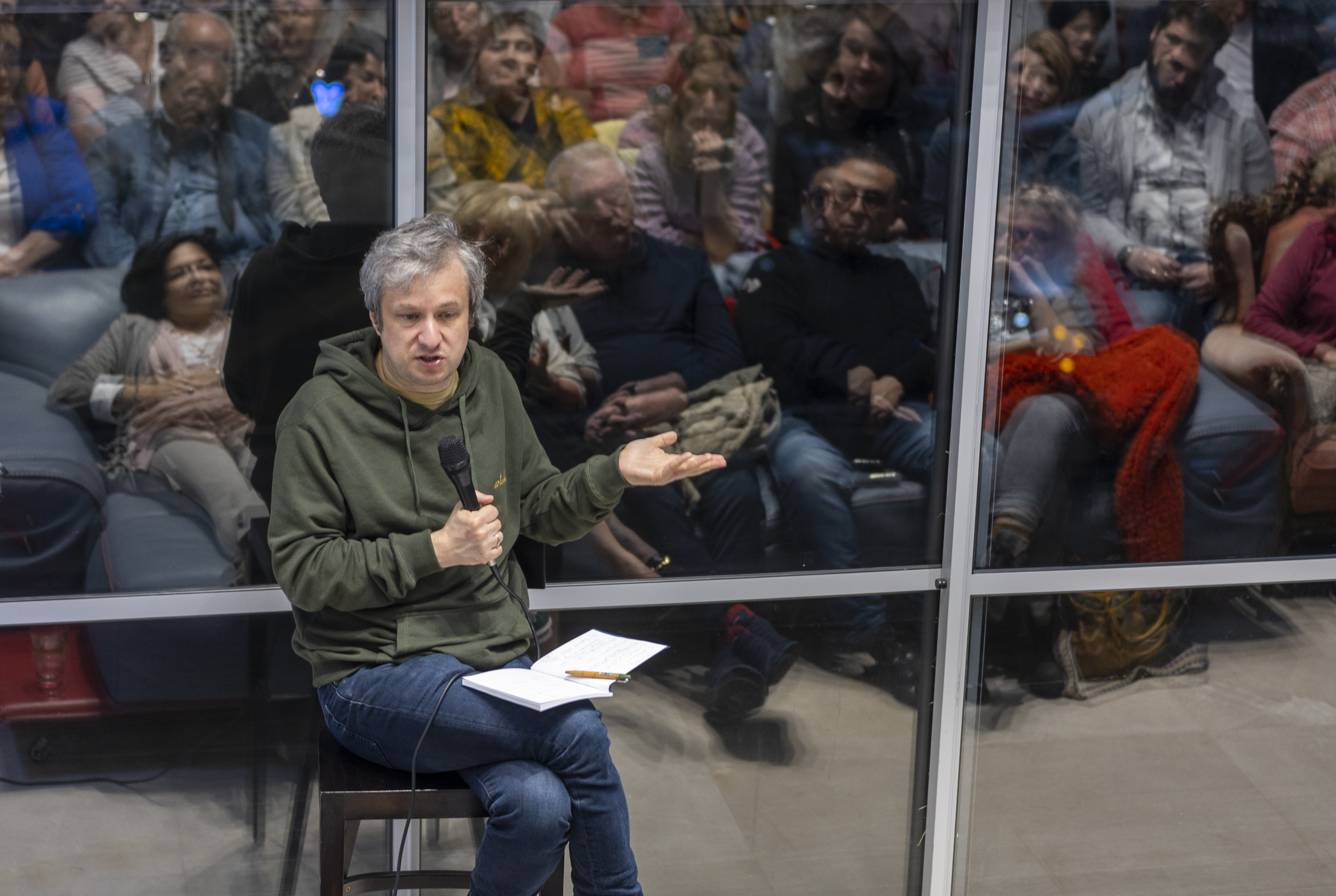
Anton Dolin at a creative meeting in Ashdod, 2023

He directed the film The Architect: The Story of Alexei German and His Films, which was released in festival distribution in October 2023. In the published version of the film, Dolin's name is not mentioned, and another voice has re-recorded his voiceover commentary.

In 2024, Dolin announced that he holds Israeli citizenship. The next year he also received Moldovan citizenship.

== Family ==
Maternal great-grandfather – Alexander Osipovich Dolin (1897, Vad-Rashkov – 1969, Moscow) – neurologist and neurophysiologist, Doctor of Medical Sciences, Professor.

Maternal great-grandmother – Fanya Isaakovna Zborovskaya (1897, Novoukrainka – 1973, Moscow) – paediatrician and hygienist, Candidate of Medical Sciences, a researcher at the Central Research Institute for the Protection of Motherhood and Infancy, the first director of the Research Institute of Pediatrics of the RSFSR Ministry of Health.

Maternal grandfather – Arkady Yakovlevich Fisher (1924–2002) – aircraft designer of NPO Lavochkin.

Maternal uncle – Alexander Dolin (1949, Moscow) – Japanologist, translator, writer, Doctor of Philosophy, Professor.

Father – Vladimir Vorobyov (1939–2022), Doctor of Physical and Mathematical Sciences.

Mother – Veronika Dolina (b. 1956, Moscow) – singer, poet, singer-songwriter.

- Brother – Oleg Dolin (b. 1981, Moscow) – theater and film actor, theater director.
- Sister – Asya Dolina (b. 1984, Moscow) – journalist and writer, worked at Echo of Moscow, Russia-24, and Unified Media Group. Later moved to the USA and joined the Voice of America radio station.
- Half-brother (paternal) – Pyotr Vorobyov (b. 1967, Moscow), scientist, writer.

Wife – Natalia Khlyustova, formerly sales director of Walt Disney Studios Sony Pictures Releasing (WDSSPR).

- Sons – Mark (b. 2002), studied at the Directing Department of VGIK; Arkady (b. 2010), as of 2023, studying in Riga.

== Public activity ==
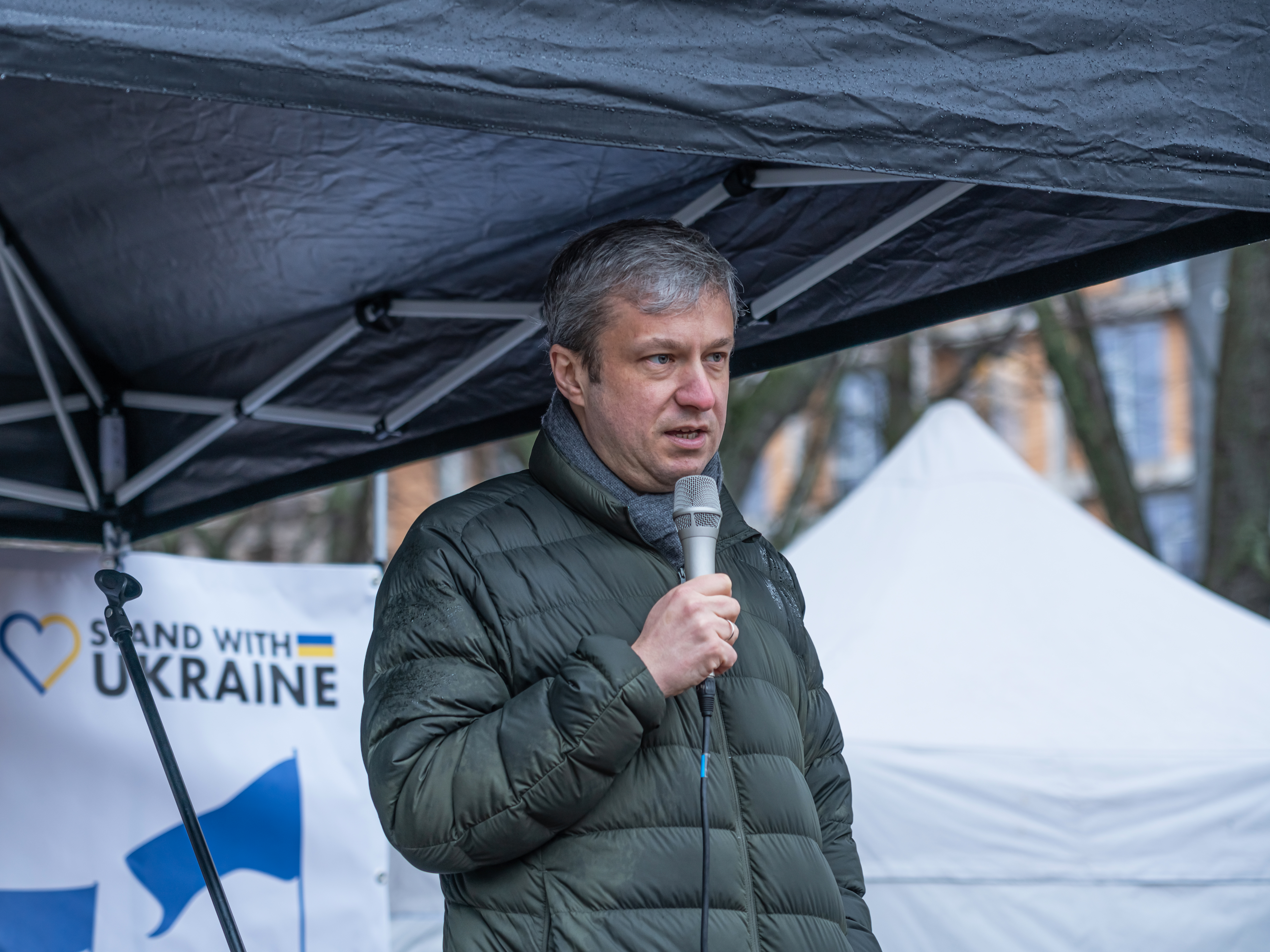
Anton Dolin speaking at a rally for solidarity with Ukraine, in Berlin on 24 February 2023

In the political sphere, Dolin is, in his own words, 'a supporter of liberalism and democracy'. He has supported opposition politician Alexei Navalny, is an admirer of many of his investigations, and has attended rallies for his release. However, the acrimonious polemic between Dolin and Navalny over the dual citizenship of journalist Sergei Brilev was widely publicised.

In 2013, Dolin opposed the Russian gay propaganda law and expressed support to the Russian LGBT community. In 2014, he supported Euromaidan and criticized the Russian government for interfering in the internal affairs of Ukraine. In September 2020, Dolin supported the Belarusian protests. On 7 March 2022, after protesting the Russian invasion of Ukraine, Dolin fled to Riga in Latvia following death threats by Russian ultranationalists. In October 2022, he was declared a foreign agent.

In 2020, he supported Lubov Arcus during a public scandal in social media that led to her resignation from Seans magazine.

He is a member of the public council of the Russian Jewish Congress.

== Artistic preferences ==
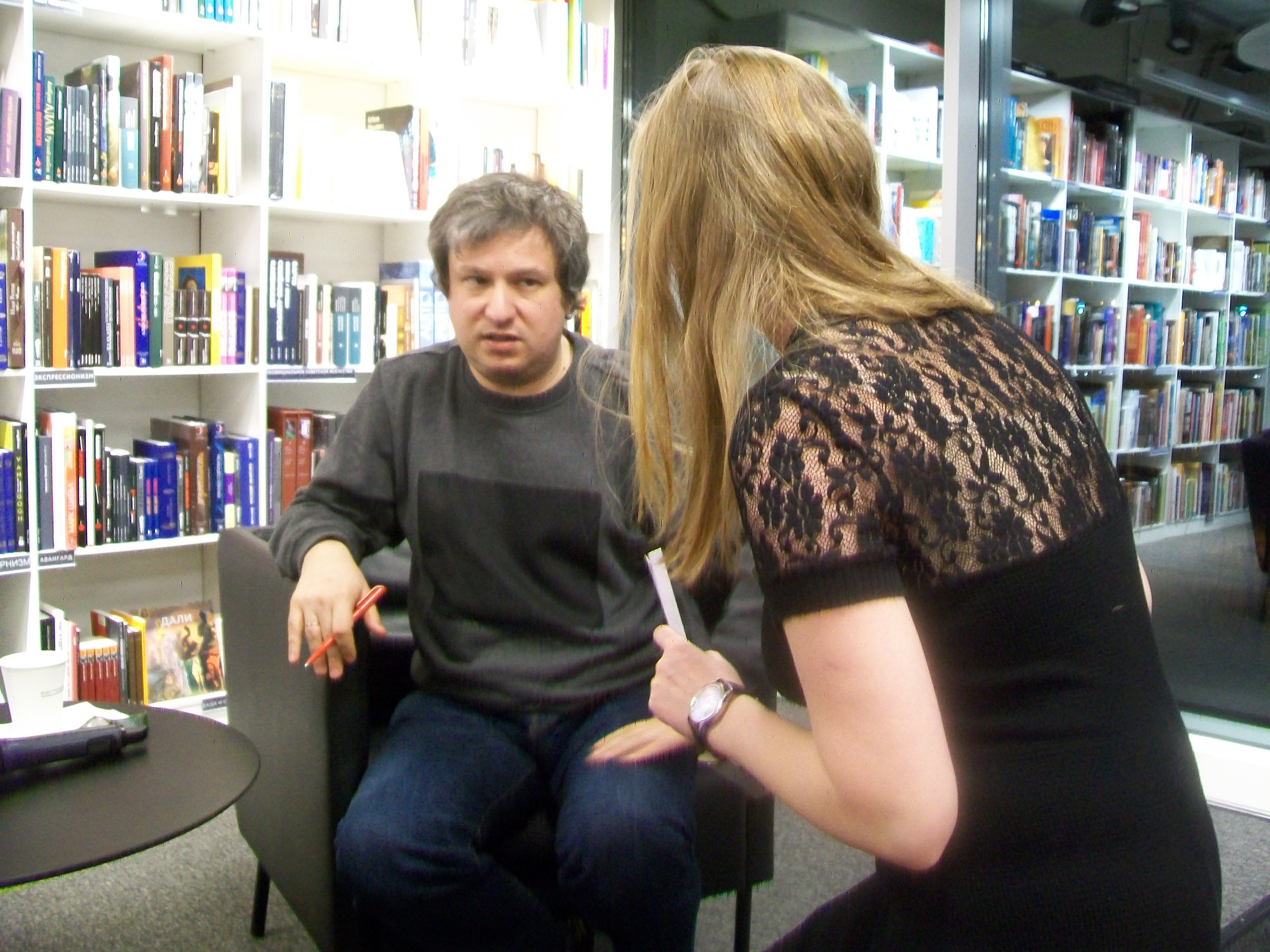
Anton Dolin after a lecture on Jim Jarmusch. March 12, 2017, Yekaterinburg, Yeltsin Center

Dolin chose following movies for the Sight & Sound's 2012 survey on the greatest films in history:

- Eraserhead by David Lynch
- The Idiots by Lars von Trier
- Indiana Jones and the Temple of Doom by Steven Spielberg
- Mirror by Andrei Tarkovsky
- My Friend Ivan Lapshin by Aleksei German
- The Word by Carl Theodor Dreyer
- The Phantom of Liberty by Luis Buñuel
- Psycho by Alfred Hitchcock
- The Seventh Seal by Ingmar Bergman
- The Nibelungs by Fritz Lang

Anton Dolin calls Manoel de Oliveira his favourite film director and Richard Wagner, Wolfgang Amadeus Mozart, and Luigi Nono his favourite composers. In 2020 he has also mentioned The Beatles as his favourite music band.

== Awards ==
Twice, Dolin won the Russian Guild of Film Critics award for his books Lars von Trier. Term Papers: Analyses, Interviews. Dogville: The Screenplay (2004) and German: Interviews. Essays. Screenplay (2011).

== Bibliography ==
- Catch XXI: Essays on Cinema of the New Century (Уловка XXI: Очерки кино нового века) (2010)
- German: Interviews. Essays. Screenplay (Герман: Интервью. Эссе. Сценарий) (2011)
- Lars von Trier. Term Papers: Analyses, Interviews. Dogville: The Screenplay (Ларс фон Триер. Контрольные работы: Анализ, интервью. Догвилль: Сценарий) (2004)
- Roy Andersson. Praise of Banality (Рой Андерссон. Похвала банальности) (2015)
- Jim Jarmusch: Poetry and Music (Джим Джармуш. Стихи и музыка) (2017)
- Shades of Russian: Essays on National Cinema (Оттенки русского: очерки отечественного кино) (2017)
- Twin Peaks: Observation Diary (Твин Пикс. Дневник наблюдений) (2021)
- How to Watch Movies (Как смотреть кино) (2020)
- Mirages of the Soviet: Essays on Contemporary Cinema (Миражи советского: очерки современного кино) (2020)
- Tales: Fantasy and Fiction in World Cinema (Сказки. Фантастика и вымысел в мировом кинематографе) (2023)
- Bad Russians: Cinema from "Brother" to "The Boy's Word" (Плохие русские. Кино от "Брата" до "Слова пацана") (2024)
