= Polina Anikeeva =

Russian-American materials scientist

Polina Olegovna Anikeeva
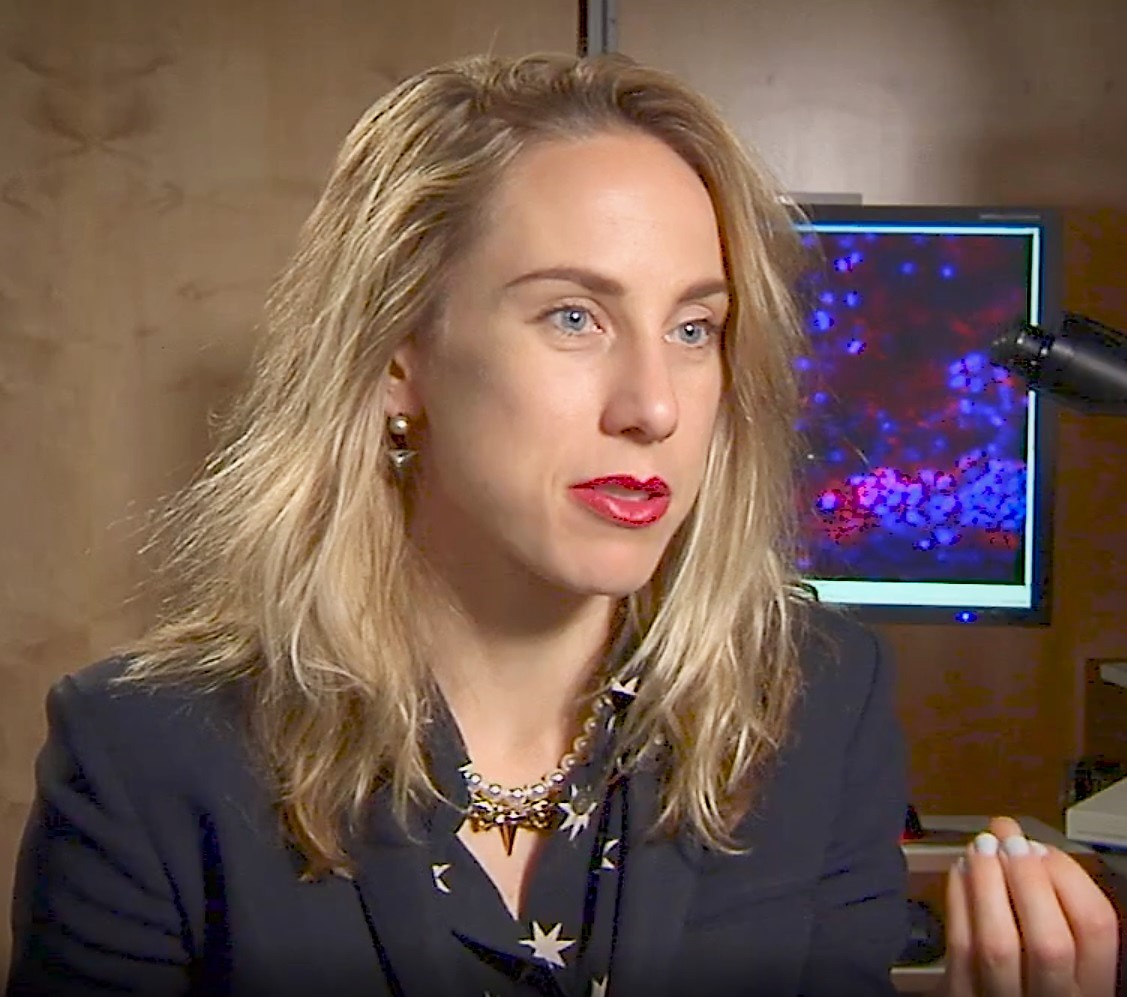
- Anikeeva in 2016
- Born: 1982 (age 43–44); Leningrad, Soviet Union
- Education: Massachusetts Institute of Technology; St. Petersburg State Polytechnic University
- Awards: National Science Foundation CAREER Award (2013)
- Scientific career
- Fields: Bioelectronics
- Workplaces: Massachusetts Institute of Technology
- Thesis: Physical properties and design of light-emitting devices based on organic materials and nanoparticles (2009)
- Doctoral advisor: Vladimir Bulović
- Other academic advisors: Karl Deisseroth
- Website: bioelectronics.mit.edu

Polina Olegovna Anikeeva (born 1982) is a Russian-born American materials scientist who is the Matoula S. Salapatas Professor of Material Science & Engineering as well as Brain & Cognitive Sciences at the Massachusetts Institute of Technology (MIT). She also holds faculty appointments in the McGovern Institute for Brain Research and Research Laboratory of Electronics at MIT. She is Head of the Department of Materials Science and Engineering. Her research is centered on developing tools for studying the underlying molecular and cellular bases of behavior and neurological diseases. She was awarded the 2018 Vilcek Foundation Prize for Creative Promise in Biomedical Science, the 2020 MacVicar Faculty Fellowship at MIT, and in 2015 was named a MIT Technology Review Innovator Under 35.

== Early life and education ==
Anikeeva was born in Saint Petersburg, Russia (then Leningrad, Soviet Union), the daughter of mechanical engineers. At 12, Anikeeva was admitted to the Physical-Technical High School. She studied biophysics at St. Petersburg State Polytechnic University, where she worked under the guidance of Tatiana Birshtein, a polymer physicist at the Institute of Macromolecular Compounds of the Russian Academy of Sciences. During her undergraduate studies she also completed an exchange program at ETH Zurich where she learned to analyze the structure of proteins using nuclear magnetic resonance spectroscopy.

After graduating in 2003, Anikeeva spent a year working in the Physical Chemistry Division at Los Alamos National Laboratory where she developed photovoltaic cells based on quantum dots (QDs). In 2004, she enrolled in the Materials Science and Engineering Ph.D. program at MIT and joined Vladimir Bulović's laboratory of organic electronics. While a graduate student, she was the lead author on a seminal paper that reported a method for generating QD light-emitting devices with electroluminescence tunable over the visible spectrum (460 nm to 650 nm). Her doctoral research was commercialized by the display industry, and acquired by a manufacturer that eventually became part of Samsung.

== Research and career ==
Anikeeva moved to Stanford University and was appointed to Karl Deisseroth's neuroscience laboratory as a postdoctoral scholar, where she created devices for optical stimulation and recording from brain circuits. The Deisseroth laboratory pioneered Optogenetics, a technique that utilizes light-sensitive ion channels such as Channelrhodopsins to modulate neuronal activity. Anikeeva worked on combining tetrodes, electronic modalities used to record neuronal activity, with optical waveguides to create optetrodes. In Deisseroth's lab, Anikeeva found a way to improve upon the fiber-optic probes they were using. Through her version, she incorporated multiple electrodes, allowing them to better capture neuronal signals. These optoelectronic devices could be used to record the electrical activity invoked by light delivered through the waveguide.

Anikeeva returned to Cambridge, Massachusetts as an AMAX Career Development Assistant Professor at MIT in 2011. The Anikeeva laboratory, which is also referred to as Bioelectronics@MIT, engineers tools to study and control the nervous system. By pursuing wireless technologies, Anikeeva's group has demonstrated techniques that use magnetic fields and injected nanoparticles to activate cells within mice brains.

Anikeeva's work emphasizes probing the brain with softer materials while integrating several functions into one device. Her research centers around creating a much less invasive way of stimulating brain cells. Her laboratory has two primary research priorities. The first is using the thermal drawing technique, a process originally developed for applications such as fiber optics and textiles, to create flexible polymer, fiber-based neural interfaces. In 2015, Anikeeva and co-workers first reported these flexible neural interfaces, which are also referred to as neural probes, and demonstrated that they could combine optical, electronic, and microfluidic modalities into a single implantable device for chronic interrogation of the nervous system. These fibers are a more advanced and scalable technology than their optetrode precursors. Since then, Anikeeva and her students have created more advanced neural interfaces that can be customized at their NeuroBionics lab and include materials such as photoresists and hydrogels.

Anikeeva's second main research theme is using magnetic fields to wirelessly modulate neuronal activity. Unlike light, which has a limited penetration depth in biological tissues due to attenuation, weak alternating magnetic fields (AMFs) have minimal coupling to biological tissues due to tissues' low conductivity and negligible magnetic permeability. In 2015, Anikeeva and her students demonstrated in a key paper published in Science that magneto-thermal stimulation with magnetic nanomaterials could be used for wireless deep brain stimulation. Follow up studies from the Anikeeva laboratory then extended this concept to stimulate mechanosensitive channels. Anikeeva and her colleagues have also shown that these magnetic nanomaterials can additionally be used to trigger drug delivery, hormone release, and for stimulating acid-sensing ion channels.

== Current research ==
Anikeeva's recent work explores the brain-gut interface, advancing the fundamental neuroscience of brain-organ communication. While her previous work centered around the central nervous system, Anikeeva is now exploring communication from the peripheral nervous system.

Particularly intrigued by the signals exchanged between the brain and nervous system, Anikeeva initially focused on understanding how sensory cells in the gut influence the brain and body through neuronal communication and hormone release. Now, Anikeeva emphasizes the reciprocal communication between the body and brain involving their two-way interaction. Her team continues to regulate and explore functions that had previously been attributed solely to central neural control.

In May 2023, Anikeeva co-founded and became the scientific advisor of the NeuroBionics lab. Her first device contains 6 tungsten microelectrodes, an optical channel for optogenetics and fiber photometry, and a fluidic channel.

During the BrainMind Special Forum on Neuromodulation + BCI + AI in June 2024, Anikeeva explained how traditional sharp materials are dangerous when injected into the brain's soft tissues. To address this, Anikeeva's team draws inspiration from the flexibility and signal transmission capabilities of natural nerves. Anikeeva's team is already designing stiff fibers that could be threaded into the brain, as well as more delicate, rubbery fibers that are still sturdy enough for the digestive track. Much of Anikeeva's recent work emphasizes the interconnectedness of the brain and body, noting that many neurological conditions also involve gastrointestinal (GI) symptoms. However, developing therapies concerning these disorders has proven a recent challenge as it is difficult to deliver them across the blood-brain barrier. Anikeeva's recent work on magnetic stimulation has raised the possibility to avoid the barrier altogether. Her future projects aim to investigate the interplay between digestive health and these neurological conditions.

=== TEDx talks ===
Anikeeva has given TEDx talks where she discusses the technologies invented in her laboratory and neural interfaces more broadly.

- "Rethinking the Brain Machine Interface," TEDxCambridge (2015). She discussed her work on neuroprosthetics and brain-machine interfaces, emphasizing her approach to match the brain's mechanical complexity through minimally-invasive materials.
- "Why You Shouldn't Upload Your Brain to a Computer," TEDxCambridgeSalon (2018). She explained the distinctions between the human brain and artificial intelligence, proposing them to collaborate.

=== Awards and honors ===
- 2013 National Science Foundation CAREER Award
- 2013 National Academy of Engineering Frontiers of Engineering Symposium
- 2013 DARPA Young Faculty Award (YFA)
- 2013 Sanofi Biomedical Innovation Award
- 2014 Dresselhaus Foundation Inaugural Award
- 2014 Outstanding Faculty Undergraduate Research (UROP) Mentor, MIT
- 2015 Junior Bose Teaching Award, School of Engineering, MIT
- 2015 MIT Technology Review Top Innovators Under 35
- 2016 National Institutes of Health Funded Award in Multi-Site Non-Invasive Magnetothermal Excitation and Inhibition of Deep Brain Structures
- 2017 SPIE Women in Optics planner
- 2018 Vilcek Prize for Creative Promise in Biomedical Science
- 2019 MITx Prize for Teaching and Learning in MOOCs
- 2020 Margaret MacVicar Faculty Fellowship
- 2021 National Institutes of Health Director's Pioneer Award for Fusion of Nanomagnetic and Viral Tools to Interrogate Brain-Body Circuits

=== Selected publications ===
- Anikeeva, Polina O.; Halpert, Jonathan E.; Bawendi, Moungi G.; Bulović, Vladimir (2009). "Quantum Dot Light-Emitting Devices with Electroluminescence Tunable over the Entire Visible Spectrum". Nano Letters. 9 (7): 2532–2536. Bibcode:2009NanoL...9.2532A. doi:10.1021/nl9002969. ISSN 1530-6984. PMID 19514711.
- Anikeeva, Polina; et al. (2012). "Optetrode: a multichannel readout for optogenetic control in freely moving mice". Nature Neuroscience. 15 (1): 163–170. doi:10.1038/nn.2992. PMC 4164695. PMID 22138641.
- Gunaydin, Lisa A.; Grosenick, Logan; Finkelstein, Joel C.; Kauvar, Isaac V.; Fenno, Lief E.; Adhikari, Avishek; Lammel, Stephan; Mirzabekov, Julie J.; Airan, Raag D.; Zalocusky, Kelly A.; Tye, Kay M.; Anikeeva, Polina; Malenka, Robert C.; Deisseroth, Karl (2014). "Natural Neural Projection Dynamics Underlying Social Behavior". Cell. 157 (7): 1535–1551. doi:10.1016/j.cell.2014.05.017. ISSN 0092-8674. PMC 4123133. PMID 24949967.
- Canales, Andres; Jia, Xiaoting; Froriep, Ulrich P.; Koppes, Ryan A.; Tringides, Christina M.; Selvidge, Jennifer; Lu, Chi; Hou, Chong; Wei, Lei; Fink, Yoel; Anikeeva, Polina (2015). "Multifunctional fibers for simultaneous optical, electrical and chemical interrogation of neural circuits in vivo". Nature Biotechnology. 33 (3): 277–284. doi:10.1038/nbt.3093. ISSN 1546-1696. PMID 25599177. S2CID 12319389.
- Chen, Ritchie; Romero, Gabriela; Christiansen, Michael G.; Mohr, Alan; Anikeeva, Polina (2015-03-27). "Wireless magnetothermal deep brain stimulation". Science. 347 (6229): 1477–1480. Bibcode:2015Sci...347.1477C. doi:10.1126/science.1261821. hdl:1721.1/96011. ISSN 0036-8075. PMID 25765068. S2CID 43687881.
