= Vasily Stepanov (critic) =

Russian writer

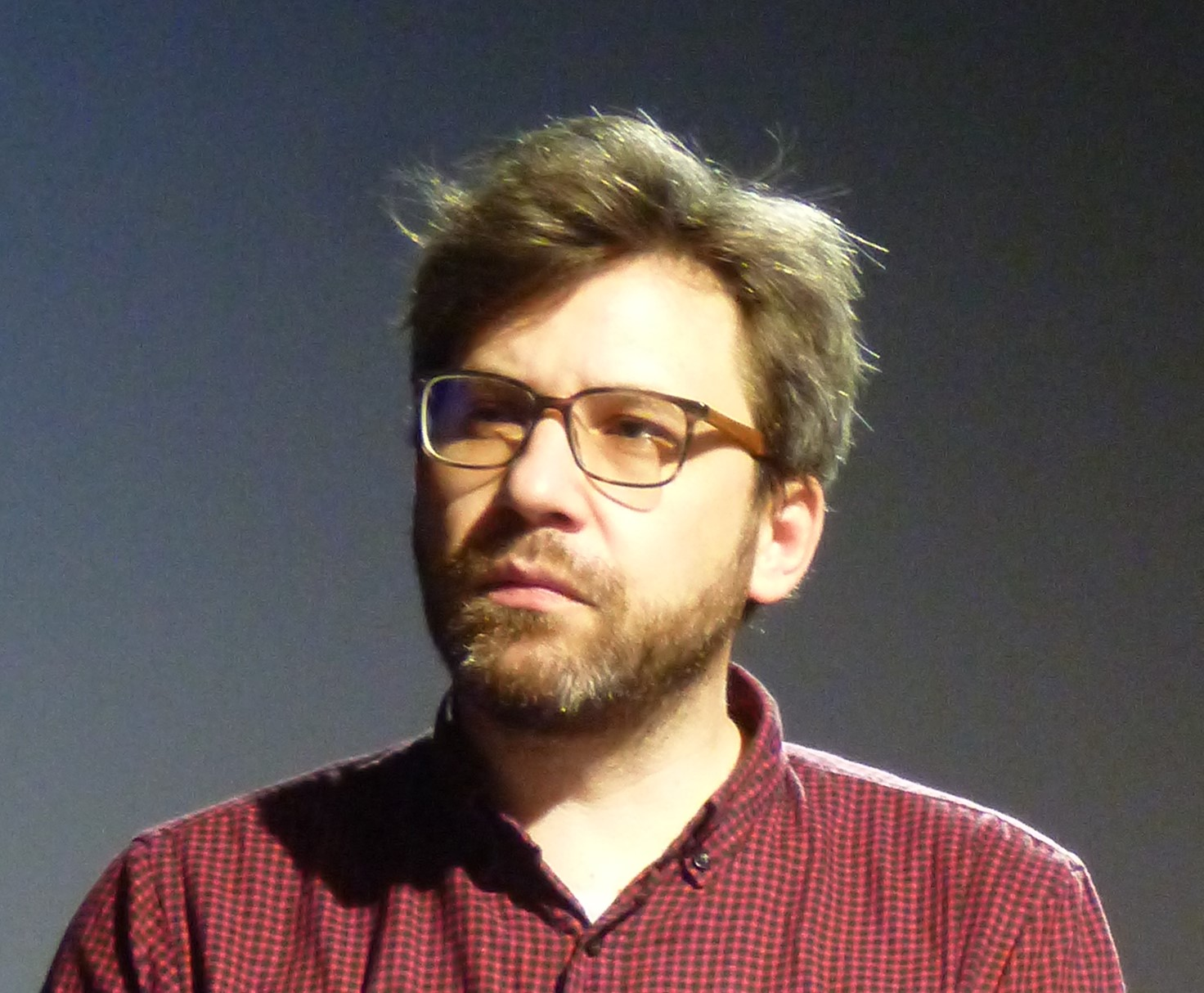
- Stepanov in Yeltsin Center, 2022
- Born: Vasily Yevgenievich Stepanov; March 11, 1981 (age 45); Leningrad, RSFSR, USSR
- Occupations: film critic, editor
- Known for: Seans

Vasily Yevgenievich Stepanov (Russian: Васи́лий Евге́ньевич Степа́нов; born in 1981) is a Russian cinema critic, journalist, columnist; since 2020 — chief editor of Seans magazine.

Stepanov was born in Leningrad, he is a St Petersburg Classical Gymnasium graduate and a SPBU alumni. He started his career as an editor of the cinema review section at Kalendar magazine, in 2006 he became an editor at Seans. Stepanov started writing for this publication much earlier, at the age of 21. Stepanov wrote for Kommersant-Weekend, Russian Reporter, Empire, Afisha, and others.

In 2019, Stepanov released Bergman, a book of critical essays and analytics, dedicated to the famous director. He also writes poetry. In 2014, he was a member of jury at the St Petersburg Video Poetry Festival.

In 2020, Stepanov took over as Seans chief editor when its founder Lyubov Arkus resigned after a defamation scandal.

In 2021, Stepanov co-authored a book Screenlife. Searching for new language in cinema. In 2022, he released a book about a prominent Soviet and Russian director Rustam Khamdamov.

In March 2022, Stepanov signed a collective appeal of film critics, film historians and film journalists of Russia against Russian invasion of Ukraine.
