= Yevgeny Surkov =

Russian theatre literary critic

Yevgeny Danilovich Surkov (Russian: Евгений Данилович Сурков; October 18 [31] 1915, Nizhny Novgorod — June 28, 1988, Moscow) was a Soviet and Russian literary, theater and film critic, editor and pedagogue. Candidate of Philological Sciences (1955).

In December 1949, Surkov entered the main editorial office of the Great Soviet Encyclopedia, where he worked until April 1951 as a senior scientific and control editor.

In the years 1953–1958, Surkov taught at the Maxim Gorky Literature Institute, and in 1964–1988 at VGIK, where he conducted a cinema studies workshop. Among his students are Sergey Kudryavtsev, Pyotr Shepotinnik, Ayaz Salayev.

From 1969 to 1982 he was the chief editor of Iskusstvo Kino.

In February 1979, Surkov led a delegation of Soviet cinematographers at the Berlin International Film Festival and, seeing the insult of the Vietnamese people in the film The Deer Hunter, initiated a boycott of the festival by delegations from socialist countries.

Surkov was one of the brightest and most controversial figures in Russian film studies who put their talents in the service of official ideology.

On June 28, 1988, Surkov died after attempting suicide. Under the will is buried in Nizhny Novgorod, in the grave of his stepfather.
