= Nancy Condee =

American linguist

Nancy Condee is a professor at the University of Pittsburgh in the Department of Slavic Languages and Literatures and served as the head of the Cultural Studies department from 1995 to 2006. Her field is contemporary Russian cinema and cultural politics.

== Life and work ==
Condee received her Ph.D. at Yale University.

She is co-organizer, with Vladimir Padunov, of the Pittsburgh Film Symposium, held each year in May at the University of Pittsburgh. Her most recent book, The Imperial Trace: Recent Russian Cinema, won the Society for Cinema and Media Studies' Katherine Singer Kovács Book Award. The book, published by Oxford University Press, focuses on contemporary Russian cinema.

== Awards ==
- 2011 - Modern Language Association (MLA) Aldo and Jeanne Scaglione Prize for Studies in Slavic Languages and Literatures
- 2010 - Annual research prize from the Society for Cinema and Media Studies (Katherine Singer Kovács Book Award)
- 2007-2009 - Appointment to Oxford University (New College) Research Network: Russian National Identity Since 1961: Traditions and Deterritorialisation. Multi-year international research network funded by the Arts and Humanities Research Council (UK)
- 2004 - British Academy Visiting Fellow: Oxford University (St. Antony's College)
- 2000-2002 - Ford Foundation Grant on Globalization and Popular Culture

== Bibliography ==
- Antinomies of Art and Culture: Modernity, Postmodernity, Contemporaneity, ed. with Terry Smith and Okwui Enwezor (Duke University Press, 2008);
- Imperial Trace: Recent Russian Cinema (Oxford University Press, 2009);
- The Cinema of Alexander Sokurov, ed. with Birgit Beumers (I.B. Tauris, 2011).

== Links ==
- Nancy Condee at GoogleScholar
