= Naum Kleiman =

Russian film critic

Naum Kleiman Нау́м Кле́йман
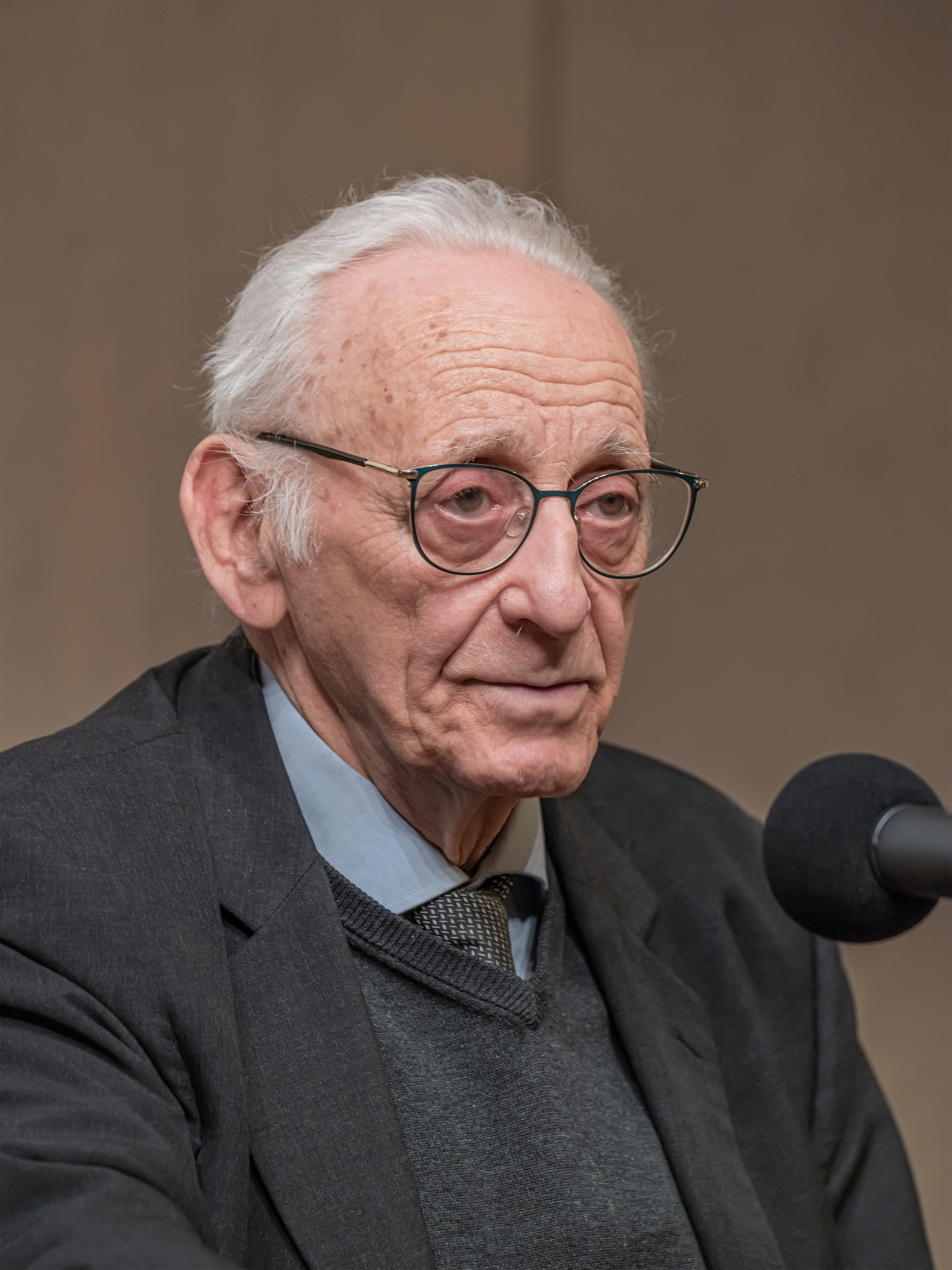
- Naum Kleiman (2024)
- Born: 1 December 1937 (age 88); Chișinău, Bessarabia
- Occupations: film critic, film historian

Naum Ikhilievich Kleiman (Russian: Нау́м Ихи́льевич Кле́йман; born 1 December 1937) is a historian of cinema, Russian film critic, specialist in Sergei Eisenstein, former manager of the Moscow State Central Cinema Museum, Eisenstein-Centre director, actor and filmmaker. He was a member of the jury at the 43rd Berlin International Film Festival in 1993 and a member of the jury at the Venice Film Festival in 1991. He is a FIPRESCI laureate.

== Biography ==
Kleiman was born on 1 December 1937 in Chișinău into the family of Ikhil Mendelevich Kleiman (1909-1988), a shoe designer, and Sofia Mikhailovna Kleiman (1910-2003), a seamstress. Her mother was from Bolhrad in southern Bessarabia, her father from the Jewish agricultural colony of Basarabeasca (Romanovka). Grandfather, Mendel Ikhilevich Kleiman (1880-1943), was deported with the June deportation in 1941, died in a camp two years later.

During the Great Patriotic War Naum Ikhilievich was in evacuation with his mother and grandmother in Andijan, and then in Kopeysk, Chelyabinsk Oblast, where his father worked. In 1946 the family returned to Kishinev. In 1949, together with his parents Kleiman was deported to Siberia - first to forced labour in the taiga, then to Guryevsk. In 1955 the family was allowed to leave the special settlement.

For a year he studied at the mathematics department of the Kyrgyz National University in Bishkek. In 1956 he entered the film studies department of Gerasimov Institute of Cinematography (workshop of N. A. Lebedev and E. M. Smirnova), which he graduated from in 1961.

In 1961-1966 Kleiman was a researcher and senior researcher in the department of scientific processing of Russian film stock of the USSR Gosfilmofond. In 1965 he was elected scientific secretary of the Commission on the Creative Heritage of S. M. Eisenstein, participated in the organisation of the Scientific Memorial Cabinet of Eisenstein at the Union of Cinematographers of the USSR. He was one of the compilers and authors of the commentary of the six-volume book "Eisenstein's Selected Works" (1964-1971). In 1967-1986 - Head of the Scientific and Memorial Cabinet of S. M. Eisenstein at the Union of Cinematographers of the USSR, editor of the All-Union Bureau of Propaganda of Cinematography.

In 1967 Kleiman participated in the restoration of Eisenstein's destroyed film "Bezhin Meadow" as a director (together with Sergei Yutkevich) and scientific adviser. Scientific adviser on the reconstruction of Eisenstein's films "Old and New" ("The General Line"), "October: Ten Days That Shook the World", "Battleship Potemkin".

Since 1987 he was Head of the museum department of the All-Union Union of Cinematographers of the USSR "Kinocentre", since 1989 - Head of the Central Cinema Museum of the All-Union Union of Cinematographers of the USSR "Kinocentre", from 1992 to 2014 - Director of the State Central Cinema Museum.

In 1990, Kleiman was one of the consultants (together with Vladimir Antropov and Yefim Levin) for Vadim Chubasov's film "S. M. Eisenstein: Lessons in Montage. ".

Since 1968 he has been teaching at the High Courses for Scriptwriters and Film Directors (first the course "History of the Cinema of the USSR", then the course "History of World Cinema"). He taught a special course on the work of S. M. Eisenstein at New York University (1990, 1991), a seminar on the aesthetics of eccentricity and the work of S. M. Eisenstein (1994, 1998) at the Deutsche Film- und Fernsehakademie Berlin in Berlin, as well as seminars on film history in Budapest, Calcutta, Los Angeles, Munich, Tokyo and Helsinki.

He has been a member of the international jury at the Venice, Berlin, Leipzig, Toronto, Paris, Locarno and Istanbul film festivals. In 1993 he was elected a member of the European Film Academy (EFA), receiving its Felix Prize. Commander of the Ordre des Arts et des Lettres (France, 1992), awarded the Goethe Medal (Germany, 1995), Commander of the Order of the Rising Sun for his contribution to the development of cultural ties between Russia and Japan (Japan, 2005).

Winner of the International Association of Film Critics FIPRESCI awards for compiling the retrospective "Unknown Soviet Cinema" (Moscow International Film Festival, 1987), Mel Novikoff (San Francisco International Film Festival, 1994), Jean Mitry (Pordenone Silent Film Festival, Italy, 1994), Russian Guild of Film Critics, and the White Pillars Festival (1998).

In 1993-1997, author and presenter of the television programmes "Cinema Museum", "Masterpieces of Silent Cinema" and "Treasures of Old Cinema". Scriptwriter and producer of the film "The Master's House" (1998).

First conversation with Naum Ikhilievich Kleiman, recorded by E. A. Golitsina for the Oral History Foundation. Original video and full transcript of the text..

Second conversation with Naum Ikhilievich Kleiman, recorded by E. A. Golitsina for the Oral History Foundation. Original video and full transcript of the text..

Third conversation with Naum Ikhilievich Kleiman, recorded by E. A. Golitsina for the Oral History Foundation. Original video and full transcript of the text..

== Family ==
- Brother - Emanuil Ihilievich Kleiman (1947-2021), a Moldovan botanist and breeder, author of the monograph "Experience of storing table watermelon fruits in biological media" (1979) and other scientific works. His brother's wife Rita Yakovlevna Kleiman (née Kleitman, 1947-2008) is a Moldovan literary critic, doctor of philological sciences, specialist in the works of F. M. Dostoevsky, head of the Department of Russian Literature of the Ion Creangă Pedagogical Institute of Chișinău and the Department of Judaic Studies of the Institute of Interethnic Studies of the Academy of Sciences of the Republic of Moldova.
- Wife - Alevtina Alekseevna Rumyantseva (1929-2011), actress.
- Daughter - Vera Naumovna Rumyantseva (born 1966), film historian, curator of the Eisenstein Scientific and Memorial Cabinet.

== Public position ==
In March 2014, he signed the letter of the Cinema Union "We are with you!" in support of Ukraine. In June of the same year, his contract as director of the Cinema Museum was not renewed.

== Awards and prizes ==
- 1987 - Moscow International Film Festival (FIPRESCI Prize for compiling the retrospective "Unknown Soviet Cinema")
- 1987 - Union of Cinematographers of the USSR (Second Prize for the article "Strange as it may seem - about Khokhlova")
- 1992 - Ordre des Arts et des Lettres (France)
- 1993 - Felix Award of the European Film Academy (for professional activity).
- 1994 - IFF of silent cinema in Pordenone (Jean Mitry Award "For participation in film restoration and the return of classic cinema to the public).
- 1995 - Goethe Medal ("For strengthening friendly and cultural ties with Germany").
- 1997 - Award of the Russian Guild of Film Critics and Film Historians (in the category "Theory and History of Cinema" for compilation, introductory article and commentary to S. Eisenstein's "Memoirs")
- 1998 - Honoured Art Worker of the Russian Federation (9 July 1998) - for services in the field of art.
- 1998 - Film Festival of the State Film Fund of Russia "White Pillars" ("For contribution to Russian film studies").
- 2002 - Ordre des Palmes académiques (France)
- 2003 - Cavalier Cross of the Order of Merit of the Republic of Poland ("For services to the promotion of Polish science and culture")
- 2004 - Prince of Venice Award of the 61st Venice Film Festival
- 2005 - Order of the Rising Sun ("For Contribution to the Development of Cultural Relations between Russia and Japan")
- 2005 - The Miron Chernenko Prize of the Guild of Russian film critics and film historians.
- 2006 - Kinotavr Festival Prize ("For Contribution to the Preservation of Russian Cultural Heritage").
- 2010 - Commander of the Ordre des Arts et des Lettres (France)
- 2015 - Camera Berlinale Honourable Mention at the Berlin International Film Festival
- 2015 - Nika Award for Best Contribution to the Cinematic Science, Criticism and Education

== Selected bibliography ==
- The Frame as a Cell of Montage // Voprosy Kinoiskusstva, in. 11, М., 1968.
- "...Let's Start with Pushkin" // The Art of Cinema. - 1987. - № 2.
- The Roaring Lion. To the origin, meaning and function of the montage metaphor // Kinologicheskie zapiski. - 1988. - № 1.
- The feat of a master // Kinoszenarii. - 1989. - № 1.
- Cinema of the Totalitarian Era. International Symposium within the framework of the XVI MIFF // The Art of Cinema. - 1990. - No. 2 (including the exhibition N. K.).
- Eccentric and tragic // Kinovedcheskie zapiski. - 1990. - № 7.
- On the article by S. M. Eisenstein "Dramaturgy of the film form" // Kinovedcheskie zapiski. - 1991. - № 11.
- Eisenstein's Unrealised Intentions // The Art of Cinema. - 1992. - № 6.
- Film Reconstruction: Text and Context // Film Studies. - 1992. - № 16.
- Our project // Kinovedcheskie zapiski. - 1994. - No. 22 (co-authored with L. Kozlov).
- "National", "international" and the Soviet film avant-garde // Kinovedcheskie zapiski. - 1994/95. - № 24.
- Film Festival and the Theory of Probabilities // Kinovedcheskie zapiski. - 1995. - № 27.
- A generation for whom a single frame means nothing... A conversation with V. Wenders // Film Studies Notes. - 1995. - № 28.
- Eisenstein today. A conversation with O. Kosolapov, N. Sirivley // The Art of Cinema. - 1996. - № 5.
- Look for the Sun! // Victor Demin. Not for Press. Compiled by T. Zapasnik. T. Zapasnik. - Moscow, Lexika, 1996.
- Eisenstein's Memoirs: a system of coordinates // Eisenstein S.M. Memoirs. - M., Museum of Cinema, Trud, 1997.
- Formula of the Final // Kinovedcheskie zapiski. - 1998. - № 38.
- The House Where Hearts Are Broken // Kinovedcheskie zapiski. - 1998. - № 40.
- Eisenstein, Bezhin Lug (first version): cultural and mythological aspects // Kinovedcheskie zapiski. - 1999. - № 41.
- "Caucasian cycles" of Pushkin (reader's notes) // Kinovedcheskie zapiski. - 1999. - № 42.
- What does Eisenstein's art model? // Kinovedcheskie zapiski. - 2000. - № 46. 1 Archived copy dated 15 November 2016 at the Wayback Machine.
- Eisenstein on paper. Graphic works of the master of cinema. - Moscow: Ad Marginem, 2017. - 320 с. - ISBN 978-5-91103-365-1.
- Sergei Eisenstein. "Yo. Memoirs" in two volumes. - M.: GARAGE, 2019. - 1016 с. - ISBN 9785990971875
- Sergei Eisenstein. Eisenstein for the twenty-first century. Collection of articles. - M.: GARAGE, 2020. - 336 с. - ISBN 9785990971769
- Etudes about Eisenstein and Pushkin. - M.: GARAGE, 2022. - 520 с. - ISBN 9785604538395

Kleiman edited Eisenstein's works, such as Montage, Metod, Non-indifferent Nature, Notes for a General History of Cinema, etc.

== Literature ==
- Modern History of Russian Cinema: 1986-2000. Film Dictionary. Vol. II. St. Petersburg, 2001. pp. 49-50.
- Kleiman N. I. Formula of the Finale. Moscow: Eisenstein Centre, 2004.
