= Sofya Raskhodnikova =

American computer scientist

- Born: 1976 (age 49–50)
- Education: Massachusetts Institute of Technology
- Scientific career
- Workplaces: Boston University
- Doctoral advisor: Michael Sipser
- Notable students: Grigory Yaroslavtsev

Sofya Raskhodnikova (born 1976) is an American theoretical computer scientist. She is known for her research in sublinear-time algorithms, information privacy, property testing, and approximation algorithms, and was one of the first to study differentially private analysis of graphs. She is a professor of computer science at Boston University.

== Education and career ==
Raskhodnikova completed her Ph.D. at the Massachusetts Institute of Technology in 2003. Her dissertation, Property Testing: Theory and Applications, was supervised by Michael Sipser.

After postdoctoral research at the Hebrew University of Jerusalem and the Weizmann Institute of Science, Raskhodnikova became a faculty member at Pennsylvania State University in 2007. She moved to Boston University in 2017.

== Other activities ==
While a student at MIT, Raskhodnikova also competed in ballroom dancing. She has been one of the organizers of TCS Women, a community for women in theoretical computer science.
