= Yuri Trushin =

Russian physicist

Dr. Sci., Professor Yuri Trushin
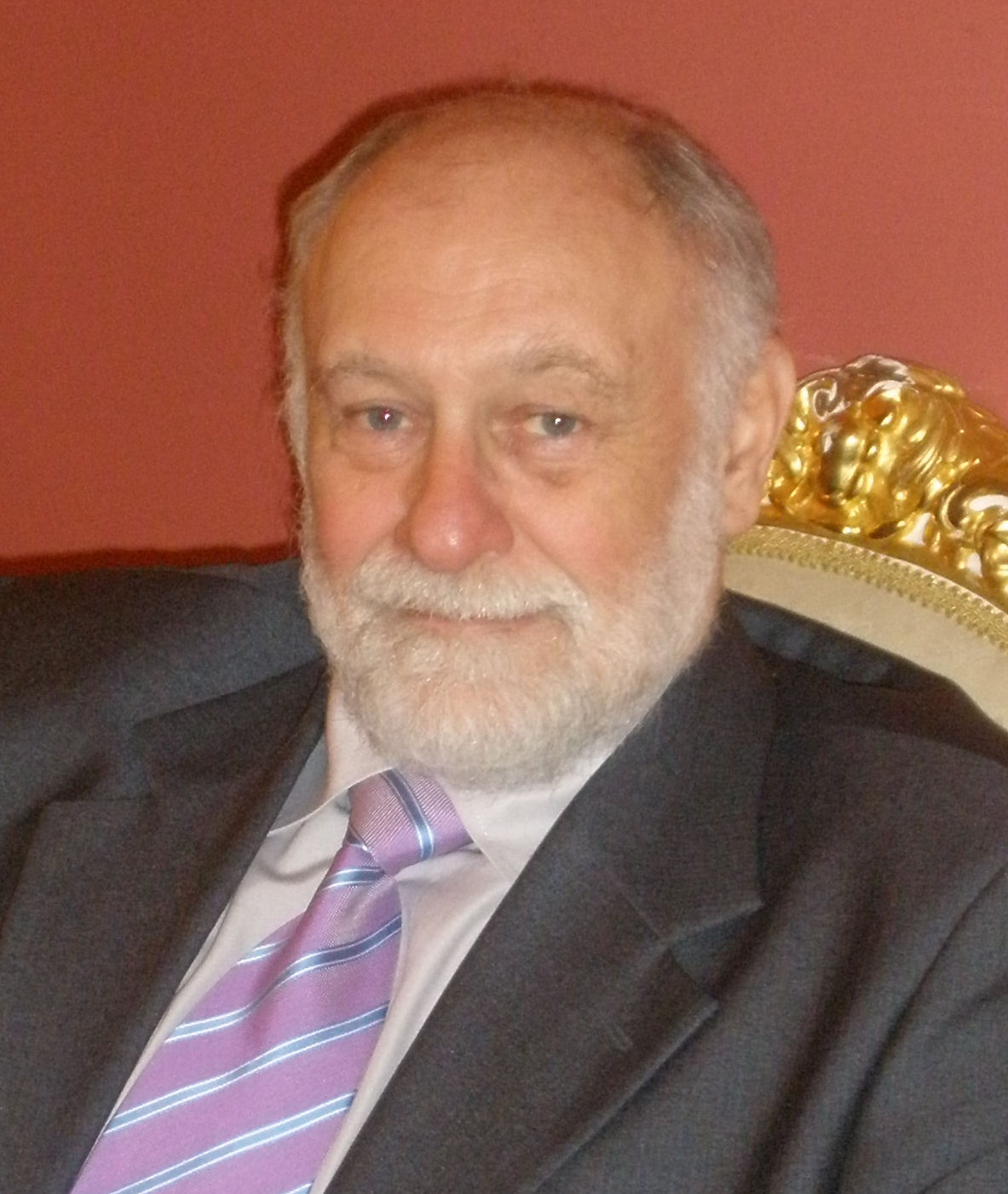
- Born: 14 August 1945 (age 81); Leningrad, USSR
- Education: Saint Petersburg State University
- Spouse: Platonova Tatiana Nikolaevna
- Children: Trushina Natalia Yurievna
- Awards: Honored Scientist of the Russian Federation
- Scientific career
- Fields: Semiconductor physics, Modeling of processes in multicomponent crystals
- Workplaces: Saint Petersburg Academic University, Ioffe Institute, Saint Petersburg State Polytechnical University

Yuri Vladimirovich Trushin (Russian: Юрий Владимирович Трушин, born 14 August 1945 in Leningrad) is a Russian physicist and professor of Theoretical Physics of semiconductors. He is a member of the Russian Academy of Natural Sciences, and has been recognized as an Honored Scientist of the Russian Federation.

== Biography ==
Trushin Yuri Vladimirovich was born on August 14, 1945, in Leningrad. He is a Soviet and Russian physicist, Honored Scientist of the Russian Federation, professor, Doctor of Physical and Mathematical Sciences, and academician of the Russian Academy of Natural Sciences.

Until December 31, 2018, he served as the Scientific Secretary of the Saint Petersburg National Research Academic University of the Russian Academy of Sciences (Academic University of RAS), as well as a professor at the Academic and Polytechnic Universities (Leningrad, Saint Petersburg), and a chief research fellow at the A. F. Ioffe Physical-Technical Institute of the USSR Academy of Sciences (later RAS) (Leningrad, Saint Petersburg) and at the Academic University of RAS (Saint Petersburg).

Field of scientific interest: theory and computer modeling of physical processes, kinetics of structural defect evolution, and radiation effects in multicomponent crystalline materials (metals, semiconductors, high-temperature materials).

He has more than 1,500 citations of his works published in peer-reviewed journals. His Hirsch index is 11.

He was a member of the editorial boards of: the All-Union collection “Issues of Atomic Science and Technology. Series: Physics of Radiation Damage and Radiation Materials Science” (Kharkov), the Journal of Technical Physics (Leningrad, Saint Petersburg), and later Letters to the Journal of Technical Physics (Saint Petersburg).

- 1945 — born in Leningrad.
- 1969 — graduated from the Department of Physics at Leningrad State University (chair for Quantum Mechanics), and started his career in the Krylov State Research Center.
- Since 1974 — has been working at the Ioffe Institute, presently he is a chief scientist in the Department of theoretical microelectronics.
- 1975 — defended his Ph.D. thesis "Theory of radiation cascades in solid state" at Leningrad Polytechnical Institute.
- 1989 — defended his Doktor nauk (D.Sci.) thesis "Theory of radiation processes in solid solutions in various phases of dissociation" at Moscow Institute of Electronic Machine Building (MIEM), specialization in solid-state physics.
- Since 1991 — has been working as a professor in the Department of Nanotechnology at Saint Petersburg State Polytechnical University.
- Since 2004 — has been working as an academic secretary in the Department for Physics of Condensed Matter and Nanotechnology, and a chief scientist in the Nanotechnology Laboratory at Saint Petersburg Academic University, simultaneously with his employments at the Ioffe Institute and at the Polytechnical University.
- 2004 — was elected to full membership in the Russian Academy of Natural Sciences (corresponding membership since 1999).
- 2008 — was awarded a title "Honored Scientist of the Russian Federation".
- From 2004 to 2018 — served as Scientific Secretary of the St. Petersburg National Research Academic University of the Russian Academy of Sciences (Academic University of RAS) — https://web.archive.org/web/20180814164829/http://www.spbau.ru/main/person%26personId%3D16 of the St. Petersburg Academic University.
- In 1997 — elected Corresponding Member of RAEN. Russian Academy of Natural Sciences
- In 2001 — elected Full Member (Academician) of RAEN. Russian Academy of Natural Sciences

== Scientific and Teaching Work ==
Trushin's research interests include theory and computer modeling of physical processes, kinetics and evolution of structural defects, as well as radiation impact in multi-component crystalline materials, such as metals, semiconductors, and high-temperature materials.

From 1971 to 1976, he worked part-time at the Leningrad Polytechnic Institute (new works on solid-state physics, assignments for the course on defect theory in crystals).

From 1976 to 1989, he concurrently worked as a physics instructor in the Preparatory Courses for applicants to the Leningrad Polytechnic Institute.

From 1976 to 1990, he concurrently worked as a senior lecturer:

At the Leningrad Technological Institute in the Department of “Radiation Physics,” he taught a year-long course “Radiation Physics of Solids” and conducted laboratory work, for which he wrote methodological guidelines for students: “Computer Modeling of Radiation Processes in Solids,” Leningrad, published by the Leningrad Technological Institute, 1988. At the Leningrad Institute of Fine Mechanics and Optics in the Department of Materials Science, he taught a year-long course “Materials Science” and conducted laboratory work. Since 1991, he has concurrently worked as a professor in the Department of “Solid-State Physics” at the Leningrad Polytechnic University (later St. Petersburg Polytechnic University) in the Physical-Technical Faculty. He taught:

For students of the “Solid-State Physics” department, a lecture course “Physical Materials Science” (Bachelor's program, semesters VI–VII), for which he wrote the textbook “Physical Materials Science,” St. Petersburg, Nauka Publishing House, 2000, and the physics study guide “Physical Foundations of Materials Science,” St. Petersburg, Academic University Publishing House, 2015. For students of the “Plasma Physics” department, a lecture course “Physical Foundations of Radiation Materials Science” (Bachelor's program, semester VII), for which he wrote the study guide “Physical Foundations of Radiation Materials Science,” St. Petersburg, St. Petersburg State Technical University Publishing House, 1996. Since 2006, he has concurrently worked as a professor in the Department of “Physics of Condensed Matter” at the Academic University of the Russian Academy of Sciences, where he taught a lecture course “History of Physics in the First Half of the 20th Century” (Master's program, semesters I–II), for which he wrote the physics study guide “Essays on the History of Physics in the First Half of the 20th Century. Part I,” St. Petersburg, Academic University Publishing House, 2012.

He supervised 6 graduate students who defended dissertations for the academic degree of Candidate of Physical and Mathematical Sciences in the specialty 01.04.07 “Solid-State Physics.”

== Organizational Activity ==
Y. V. Trushin participates in the work of Dissertation councils:

1. Ioffe Physical-Technical Institute of the Russian Academy of Sciences, No. D 002.205.02
2. Санкт-Петербургский политехнический университет Петра Великого, N Д 212.229.29 Saint Petersburg Polytechnic University of Peter the Great, No. D 212.229.29
3. Санкт-Петербургский Академический университет РАН, N ДМ 002.268.01;Saint Petersburg Academic University of the Russian Academy of Sciences, No. DM 002.268.01

Scientific councils:

1. Отделения физических наук РАН по радиационной физике твёрдого тела.Department of Physical Sciences of the Russian Academy of Sciences on Radiation Physics of Solids. Scientific Council of the Department of General Physics of the USSR Academy of Sciences, later the Department of Physical Sciences of the Russian Academy of Sciences on the issue “Radiation Physics of Solids”
2. Coordinating Scientific and Technical Council of the Ministry of Medium Machine Building on “Physics of Radiation Damage in Solids”
3. Coordinating Scientific and Technical Council of the Russian Academy of Sciences and Rosatom on “Materials for Thermonuclear Reactors”

Administrative councils:

1. Academic Council of the Physical-Technical Faculty of the Leningrad Polytechnic Institute (later Polytechnic University)
2. Scientific and Educational Center of the Ioffe Physical-Technical Institute of the Russian Academy of Sciences
3. Department of Solid-State Electronics of the Ioffe Physical-Technical Institute of the Russian Academy of Sciences
4. Academic Council of the Saint Petersburg National Research Academic University of the Russian Academy of Sciences

He has written several books and over 250 papers published in peer-reviewed journals, Hirsch index is 11.

Served as an editorial board member of the Technical Physics Journal (Russian: Журнал технической физики).

== Published books ==
- Yu.V. Trushin. Problems of modern energetics. (in Russian) Leningrad, 1982, Znanie, 16 pp.
- A.N. Orlov, Yu.V. Trushin. Point defect energies in metals. (in Russian) Moscow: Energoatomisdat, 1983, 81 pp.
- V.V. Kirsanov, A.L. Suvorov, Yu.V. Trushin. Processes of radiation defect formation in metals. (in Russian) Moscow: Energoatomisdat, 1985, 222 pp.
- S.N. Romanov, Yu.V. Trushin, V.I. Shtan'ko. Computer modeling of radiation processes in solid state bodies. (in Russian) Methodical directions. LTI im. Lensoveta, Leningrad, 1988, 40 pp.
- Yu.V. Trushin. Theory of radiation processes in metal solid solutions. New York, Nova Science Publishers, Inc. 1996, 405 pp.
- Yu.V. Trushin. Course of physical basis of radiation material science. (in Russian) SPb TU, 1996, 80 pp.
- Yu.V. Trushin. Physical Material Science. (Textbook for Technical Universities) (in Russian) St.Petersburg: Nauka, 2000, 286 pp.
- Yu.V. Trushin. Radiation processes in multicomponent materials (theory and computer modeling). (in Russian) St.Petersburg: Ioffe Physical Technical Institute, 2002, 384 pp.
- Yu.V. Trushin. Essays about history of physics of first half of XX century. Part.1. Becoming of quantum mechanics – basis of modern physics. (Textbook for Technical Universities) (in Russian) Academic University, series “Lectures in Academic University”, vol.2, St.Petersburg, 2012, 324 pp.
- Yu.V. Trushin. Physical Material Science (Textbook for Technical Universities) (in Russian) Academic University, series “Lectures in Academic University”, vol.3, St.Petersburg, 2012, 356 pp.

== Scientific articles ==
Yu. V. Trushin, Kinetics of Cascade Formation in Crystals. // Physics of the Solid State (ФТТ), 1974, Vol. 16, pp. 3435–3436.

- A. M. Parshin, Yu. V. Trushin, The Property of Supersaturated Solid Solutions to Enhance Recombination of Oppositely Charged Defects. // Letters to the Journal of Technical Physics (ЖТФ), 1983, Vol. 9, pp. 561–564.
- A. N. Orlov, Yu. V. Trushin, Computer Modeling of the Interaction of Fast Particles with Crystals. // Priroda (Nature), 1983, No. 10, pp. 34–43.
- A. N. Orlov, A. M. Parshin, Yu. V. Trushin, Physical Aspects of the Mitigation of Radiation Swelling in Structural Materials. // Journal of Technical Physics (ЖТФ), 1983, Vol. 53, pp. 2367–2372.
- S. K. Dzhaparidze, Yu. V. Trushin, Chains of Substitution Collisions in Diatomic Crystals. // Journal of Technical Physics (ЖТФ), 1985, Vol. 55, pp. 1824–1826.
- Yu. V. Trushin, V. Pompe, Distribution of Point Defects in the Stress Field Near Second Phase Precipitates. // Letters to the Journal of Technical Physics (ЖТФ), 1985, Vol. 11, pp. 393–397.
- N. P. Kalashnikov, Yu. V. Trushin, Energy – Radiation – Crystals. // Priroda (Nature), 1985, No. 8, pp. 24–34.
- V. V. Kirsanov, Yu. V. Trushin, Irradiation of Stressed Metals. // Priroda (Nature), 1986, No. 11, pp. 69–74.
- Yu. V. Trushin, Distribution of Intrinsic Point Defects Near Spherical Second Phase Precipitates Under Irradiation. // Journal of Technical Physics (ЖТФ), 1987, Vol. 57, pp. 226–231.
- 12. Yu.N.Eldyshev, Yu.V.Trushin, Small Interstitial Clusters as Recombination Centers in Decomposing Solid Solutions during Irradiation. Proc. Int.Conf. on Ion Implantation and Ion Beam Equipment, Bulgaria, Elenite, Sept.1990, World Scientific, 1991, P. 168—174.
- 13. Yu.V.Trushin. Point Defect Flows and Radiation Swelling in a Biphase Material. J.Nucl.Materials, 1991, V.185, P.268 — 272.
- 14. Yu.V.Trushin, Theory of Radiation Processes in Decomposed Solid Solutions. J.Nucl.Materials, 1991, V.185, P.279 — 285.

- Yu. V. Trushin, Influence of Precipitates of the Secondary Phase on Radiation Swelling of Decomposing Solid Solutions. // Journal of Technical Physics (ЖТФ), 1992, Vol. 62, pp. 1–22.
