= Vladimir Padunov =

American academic (1947–2022)

Vladimir Padunov was an associate professor at the University of Pittsburgh in the Slavic Languages and Literatures Department and also served as the associate director of the Film Studies Program.

Padunov was the former deputy editor of Kinokultura, an online journal focusing on contemporary Russian cinema.

Padunov received his B.A. at Brooklyn College and his M.A. and Ph.D. at Cornell University. He previously taught at University of Iowa and Hunter College, as well as in Germany and Russia.

He also directed the Pittsburgh Russian Film Symposium, which takes place each May, every year since its creation in 1999.

Padunov was married to fellow University of Pittsburgh Professor Nancy Condee, with whom he had two children.

Padunov died on 26 June 2022.
