= Physics and Technology School =

Academic Lyceum Physics and Technology School

Location
- 293F+5Q Kalininsky District; Saint Petersburg; Russia
- Coordinates: 60.003024°N 30.374413°E

Information
- Founded: 1987
- Founder: Zhores Alferov
- Director: Ivanov Georgievich
- Grades: 8-11
- Gender: coed
- Enrollment: 200 (2019)
- Newspaper: "Mixed News" (1987), "Position" (1989)
- Website: school.ioffe.ru

Academic Lyceum Physics and Technology School, (also Physical-Technical School, abbreviated "PhTS", "FTSH"), a St. Petersburg National Research Academic University of the Russian Academy of Sciences, is a Russian high school founded in 1987 by Zhores Alferov. The Physics and Technology School is the only high school in Russia belonging to the Russian Academy of Sciences, and regularly places students in international math, physics, and science olympiads.

== History ==
The Physics and Technology School was founded in 1987 by Nobel laureate Zhores Alferov and colleagues at the Ioffe Institute, originally under the administrative umbrella of the Ioffe Institute.

The groundwork for the school was laid by two employees of the Ioffe Institute, Igor Alexandrovich Merkulov and Mikhail Georgievich Ivanov, beginning in 1983, who were later joined by the current head of the Ioffe computer center, Andrei Aleksandrovich Fursenko. In 1984, the three convinced Vladimir Maksimovich Tuchkevich, the director of the Ioffe Institute, and with his help received permission to create a vocational school. However, the funds were still not in place in 1986. Towards the end of 1986, Zhores Alferov became a supporter of project, and with Alferov taking over from Tuchkevich as the director of the Ioffe Institute in 1987, funds were secured to found the school in 1987. The first classes began in September 1987.

In 2009, PhTS was officially joined with the St. Petersburg Academic University, also founded by Zhores Alferov. The St. Petersburg Academic University was first founded by Alferov as the Research and Education Center of the Ioffe Institute in 1997, and then received a charter to become a university in 2002. The Physics and Technology secondary school and the Academic University had been located on the same campus site, but the organizational change in 2009 integrated them into the same administrative structure.

The St. Petersburg Academic Institute has a three-part structure; it joins the Russian Academy of Sciences, a national organizing body for professional scientists, with the university structure of the Academic Institute, offering M.S. and Ph.D. degrees, as well as with the Physics and Technology School secondary school. Due to this unique structure, the PhTS is the only high school in Russia that is a part of the Russian Academy of Sciences. One of Alferov's goals in creating the Academic Institute structure was to invigorate a leading scientific research institute with the exposure to gymnasium students, creating a pipeline of future scientific researchers.

== Class body and achievements ==
PhTS class body is roughly 200 students, with grades 8 through 11. The available majors include physics, mathematics, computer science, and English.

Students of PhTS place annually in the International Mathematics Olympiad (IMO), International Physics Olympiad (IPhO), and additional International Science Olympiads.

The Physics and Technology School is regularly ranked second overall among high schools in St. Petersburg, with the Saint Petersburg Lyceum 239 specializing in mathematics placing first.

== Teaching staff ==
A significant portion of the Physics and Technology School teaching staff have PhDs, due to the integration with the Saint Petersburg Academic University. A number of the teaching staff graduated from PhTS lyceum themselves; as of 2019 twelve of the 26 full-time and 25 part-time teachers were graduates of the PhTS.

== Notable alumni ==
From 1989 through 2018, 1514 students graduated from PhTS. Notable alumni include

- Dmitry Feichtner-Kozlov (1990)

== Partnerships and funding ==
PhTS has several learning exchanges with the United States, an initiative begun by Alferov. One such exchange is with the Illinois Mathematics and Science Academy high school founded by Leon Lederman. Alferov spent 6 months at the University of Illinois in 1970 and built lasting relationships with scientists there.

In addition to the Foundation for Support of Education in Society (Alferov Foundation), PhTS lists the Open Society Institute founded by George Soros and Siemens in Russia as funding sources.
