= Yaroslavtsev Log =

Yaroslavtsev Log Ярославцев Лог
- Selo
- Location within Altai Krai Location within Russia
- Coordinates: 52°16′N 80°05′E
- Country: Russia
- Region: Altai Krai
- District: Rodinsky District
- Time zone: UTC+7:00

Yaroslavtsev Log (Russian: Ярославцев Лог) is a rural locality (a selo) and the administrative center of Yaroslav-Logovskoy Selsoviet, Rodinsky District, Altai Krai, Russia. The population was 756 as of 2013. There are 7 streets.

== Geography ==
Yaroslavtsev Log is located 28 km south of Rodino (the district's administrative centre) by road. Novokormikha is the nearest rural locality.
