= Alexander Sukhanov =

Russian musician (born 1952)

Alexander Alekseevich Sukhanov (Russian: Алекса́ндр Алексе́евич Суха́нов, 25 May 1952) is a Soviet and Russian poet, composer, bard and mathematician who created more than two hundred songs.

== Biography ==
Alexander Sukhanov was born on 25 May 1952 in Saratov, Russia, USSR. During childhood he studied music, graduating from music school as a violin major. In 1974 Sukhanov earned an undergraduate degree (with honors) from the Mechanics and Mathematics Department of Moscow State University. He later earned a Ph.D. in Mathematics from the same institution. He taught mathematics at Gagarin Air Force Academy; since 1981 he has worked at the computational methods laboratory at MSU.

In 1969 Sukhanov began writing music to his own lyrics, as well as to the poetry of Samuil Marshak, Iosif Utkin, Percy Shelley, Alexander Vertinsky, Alexander Pushkin, Nikolai Rubtsov, and others. He gained wide success as a performer of his songs at concerts and festivals. Sukhanov composed scores for several plays, released a Melodia record as well several CD albums.

== Selected discography ==
- Green Carriage, 1996
- Oh, you're my cart ..., 1998
- Romance of old age, 2000
- Snowdrops of tenderness, Disk 2, Disk 1, 2002
- Selected songs

== Links ==
- Home Page
- Interview with Sukhanov by Natella Boltyanskaya at Echo of Moscow
- Selected lyrics (Russian)
- His page at Russian Bard Resource page
- Catalog of soundtracks of his songs
