= Daniil Dondurey =

Russian film critic and sociologist (1947–2017)

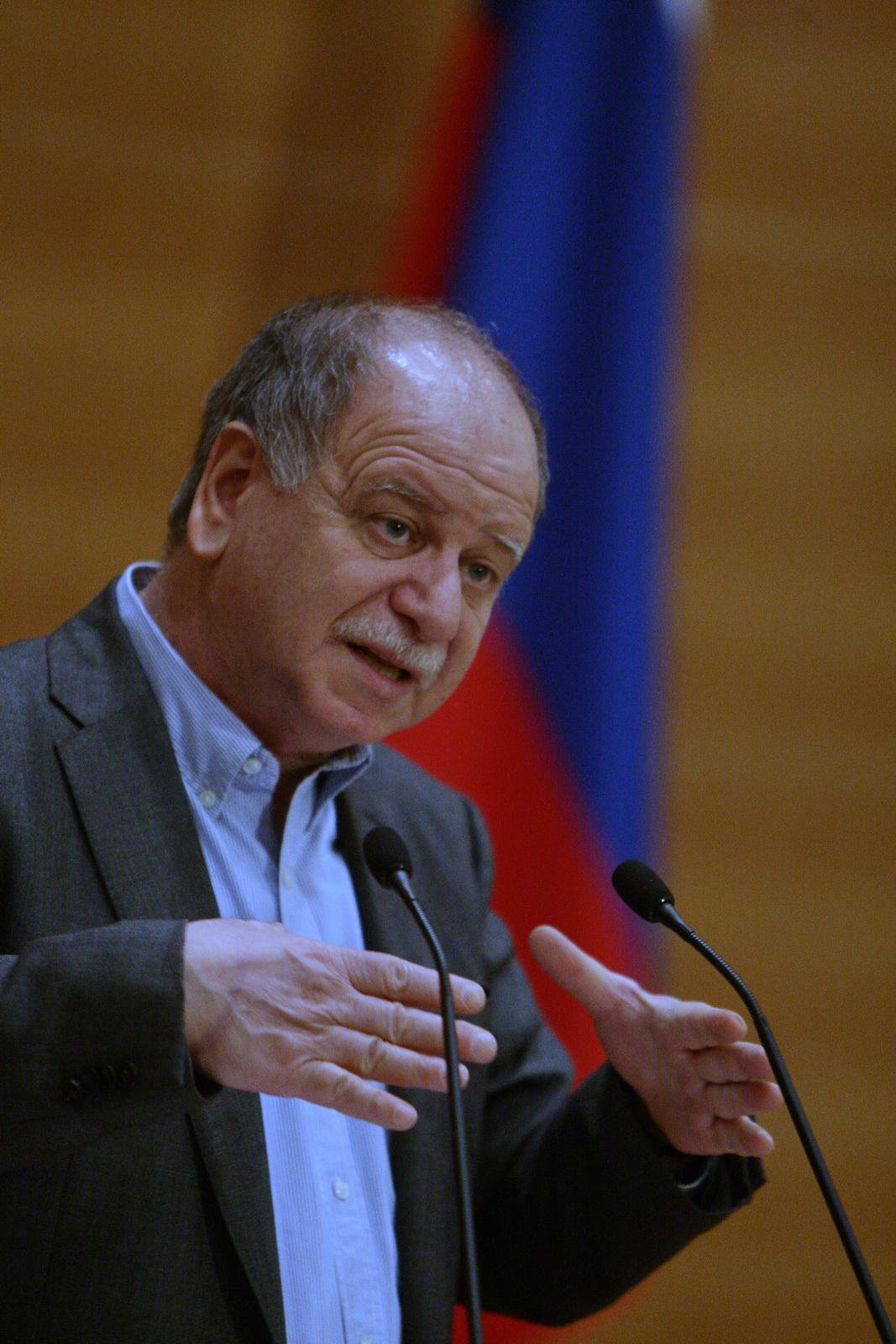
- 2014
- Born: May 19, 1947; Ulyanovsk, RSFSR, USSR
- Died: May 10, 2017 (aged 69); Israel
- Education: Penza Art College; Repin Institute of Painting, Sculpture and Architecture; Institute of Sociology RAS

Daniil Borisovich Dondurey (Russian: Дании́л Бори́сович Дондурей; May 19, 1947 in Ulyanovsk – May 10, 2017 in Israel) was a Soviet and Russian culturologist, film critic, sociologist of the media, editor in chief of the journal Iskusstvo Kino, and Candidate of Philosophy.

He was a member of Presidential Council for Civil Society and Human Rights, and a member of the Public Council of the Russian Jewish Congress.

== Biography ==
He was born into the family of engineer Boris Danilovich Dondurey and lawyer Faina Moiseevna Cher.

In 1975–1981, he worked at the Institute of the History of Art, in 1981–1986 in the Scientific Research Institute of Culture of the RSFSR.

He compiled a number of scientific collections on the sociology of culture, theory and history of the fine arts, theater and cinema. His works have been translated and published in Bulgaria, Hungary, Vietnam, Germany, Italy, Cuba, Poland, Romania, USA, France, and Czechoslovakia.
