= Saint Petersburg Academic University =

University in Russia

Coordinates: 60°00′09″N 30°22′25″E

Alferov Federal State Budgetary Institution of Higher Education and Science Saint Petersburg National Research Academic University of the Russian Academy of Sciences
- Санкт-Петербургский Академический университет — научно-образовательный центр нанотехнологий РАН
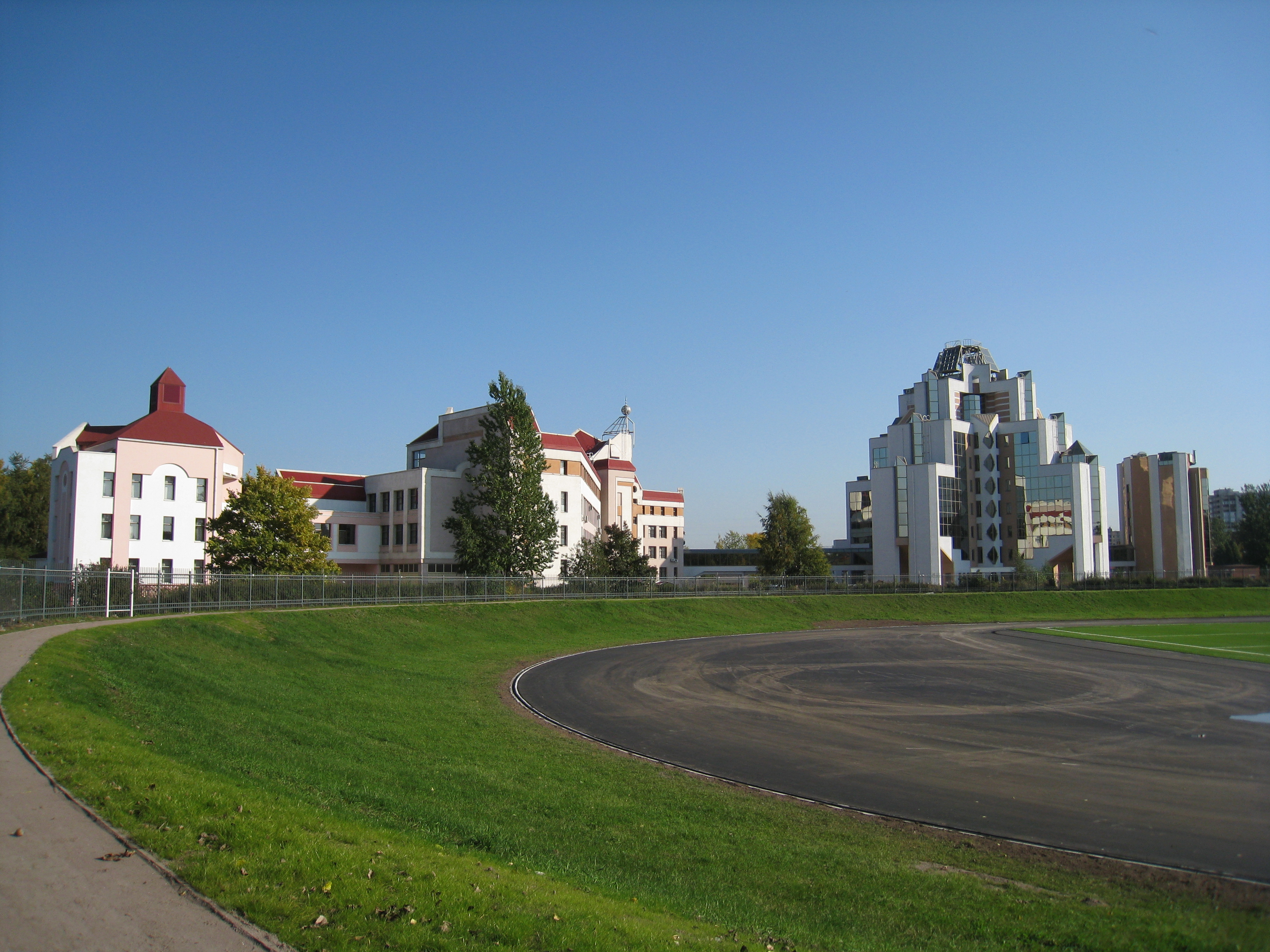
- Established: 1997
- Rector: Alexey V. Filimonov
- Location: Khlopin St. 8/3, St. Petersburg, Russia, Saint Petersburg, Russian Federation

Alferov Federal State Budgetary Institution of Higher Education and Science Saint Petersburg National Research Academic University of the Russian Academy of Sciences (abbreviated SPbAU RAS, also referred to as the Academic University or Alferov University) was founded in 1997 originally as the Research and Education Center of the Ioffe Institute to integrate science and education in the field of physics and information technologies. It has the distinction of being the only university in the Russian Academy of Sciences (RAS), which is composed primarily of national research institutes. Accordingly, the word "Academic" in the university's name stems from the Academy of Sciences, the organization that unites numerous national research institutes in Russia. The St. Petersburg Academic University was founded by Zhores Alferov, director of the Ioffe Institute, vice-president of the RAS Academician and Nobel prize laureate, who served as its rector until his death on March 1, 2019.

== History ==
In 1997 Zhores Alferov founded the Research and Education Center of the Ioffe Institute, which would become the Saint Petersburg Academic University. The official founding as a university took place on October 8, 2002.

In 2009 the university was reorganized by joining with both the St. Petersburg Research and Education Centre of Physics and Technology and with the School of Physics and Technology (established in 1987), one of the best secondary schools in Russia. At this time, the university was given its present name, Saint Petersburg Academic University.

In 2010, Saint Petersburg Academic University obtained the status of the National Research University of Russia. The stated purpose of the university as a National Research University is to develop high-tech sectors of the economy, with a particular focus on nanoelectronics, nanophotonics, renewable energy sources and nanobiosystems.

It is planned to reorganize the Academic University by joining it to the Peter the Great St. Petersburg Polytechnic University since 2021 as an autonomous institution.

== Structure ==
Alferov states that the idea of tripartite “composition” of the institute - consisting of the Academy of Sciences for professional scientists, the Academic University for university students, and a Gymnasium for secondary school students - was inspired by a similar underlying philosophy in Peter the Great's founding of the Academy of Science in 1724. The Saint Petersburg Academic University follows this model, cemented by the reorganization in 2009, as an institute uniting national laboratories, university departments, and secondary school in the same campus and overarching organization. The proposed benefit of this model is that secondary school, university and post-graduate students are trained in direct contact with active scientists, and teaching occurs through lectures, seminars, and also in laboratories.

The university consists of five departments:

- Department of Mathematics and Information Technology;
- Department of Physics and Technology of Nanostructures;
- Department of Physics of Condensed Matter;
- Department of Theoretical Physics;
- Department of Foreign Languages.

As of 2020, the acting rector is Dr. Alexey Filimonov.

== Teaching ==
The Academic University has Masters and PhD programs. The MSc programs (state license #0724, February 17, 2011) are as follows:

- Theoretical computer science: The curriculum includes basic and advanced courses in algorithms, computational complexity, discrete mathematics, mathematical logic, cryptography and numerous more specialized subjects of contemporary computer science. However, the principal thing is doing research under supervision of active researchers (in particular, several members of Steklov Institute of Mathematics at St. Petersburg).
- Software engineering: The curriculum is composed in collaboration with the largest IT-companies of Russia and is based on the international standards in software engineering. The main distinctive feature of the program is a project-oriented educational model, where students are involved (individually or in groups) in real projects development supervised by professional software engineers.
- Algorithmic Bioinformatics: The curriculum includes advanced algorithms and data structures with application to large-scale data mining in molecular biology.
- Theoretical and mathematical physics.
- Physics of Low-dimensional State.

Among the professors of the Academic University, there are scientists employed also at Ioffe Institute, such as Yu.V. Trushin.

== Location ==
The address of the university is Khlopin St. 8/3, St. Petersburg, Russia. The dormitory is at Maurice Toreza Ave. 37/2, St. Petersburg.
