= Lyubov Arkus =

Russian film director

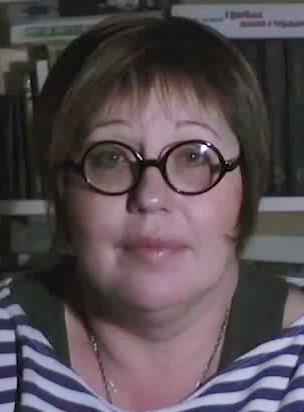
- Born: Lyubov Yuryevna Arkus; September 20, 1960 (age 65); Lviv
- Occupations: film critic; film director
- Years active: 1984—present
- Known for: Seans magazine, Anton's Right Here charity foundation

Lyubov Yuryevna Arkus (Russian: Любовь Юрьевна Аркус; born 1960) is a Russian director, film expert, editor, founder of Seans magazine, Anton's Right Here charity foundation, and Chapaev.media educational project.

== Biography ==
=== Early years and education ===
As recalled by Arkus, her family was of Jewish descent, her father's ancestors stemmed from Odesa and lived in Harbin. Her paternal grandfather Boris Arkus (1896–1938) was arrested in repressions of 1937 and shot in 1938, his widow was arrested and spent all her life in labour camps.

Arkus entered Gerasimov Institute of Cinematography from the third attempt, she studied at the course of Lidiya Zaitseva. After graduation in 1984, she worked as a literary secretary of Viktor Shklovsky and an editor at Lenfilm.

=== Seans ===
In 1989, she founded Seans magazine that soon became the best Russian blueprint on cinema. In 1993, Arkus became the editor-in-chief. In 1993, Seans launched its publishing house. In 2001-2004 it released a monumental seven-volume almanac Recent History of Russian Cinematography. 1986-2000. Arkus wrote multiple articles, compiled and edited the book. In 2010, Seans established its creative workshop. Under Arkus, the publication grew into the most influential magazine on cinema with leading modern writers as columnists. By peers, the magazine is acknowledged ‘the last stronghold of common sense in modern Russia’.

=== Anton's Right Here ===
In 2008, while working on Seans' initiative Cinema of open action, Arkus encountered Anton Kharitonov, a teenager with ASD. She became deeply involved in his life, trying to save him from a psychoneurological dispensary. To gain public attention to problems of people with ASD, Arkus decided to film a documentary about Anton.

Mostly the film budget was spent on solving the heroes' problems. Operator Alisher Xamidxojaev denied payment for his work and financially supported Anton. AdVita foundation paid for Renata, Anton's mother, cancer treatment. Konstantin Ernst helped to release Anton from the neuropsychiatric detention center. Friends of Arkus Sergei Bodrov, Renata Litvinova, Dunya Smirnova, Anna Parmas, and many more helped Anton in crisis moments.

The movie Anton's Right Here received numerous Russian and international awards and was screened at the 69th Venice Film Festival.

In 2013, Arkus opened a charitable foundation, named in honour of Anton Kharitonov. The foundation helps socialization, education and creative involvement of children and adults with ASD. First of its kind in Russia, by 2021 the foundation grew into a center that helps more than 500 families with ASD members.

=== Other activities ===
In March 2022, Arkus signed a collective appeal of film critics, film historians and film journalists of Russia against Russian invasion of Ukraine.
