= Iskusstvo Kino =

Russian film magazine

- Editor: Stanislav Dedinsky
- Categories: Film magazine
- Frequency: Monthly (1931-1941); Irregular (1945-1947); Bi-monthly (1947-1951); Monthly (1952-2023)
- Founded: 1931
- Final issue: May 2023
- Country: Russia
- Based in: Moscow
- Language: Russian
- Website: Iskusstvo Kino
- ISSN: 0130-6405
- OCLC: 3321631

Iskusstvo Kino (Russian: Искусство кино, lit. 'Cinema Art') was a film magazine published in Moscow, Russia. It was one of the earliest magazines in Europe to specialize in film theory and review, alongside British magazine Sight & Sound and French magazine Cahiers du Cinéma. It was a print publication between 1931 and 2023.

== History and profile ==
The magazine was established in 1931. Its original title was Proletarskoe kino, which was used for one year between 1931 and 1932. The magazine was renamed as Sovetskoe kino in 1933 and was published under this title until 1935. Its headquarters was in Moscow.

The magazine was published on a monthly basis from its start in 1931 to 1941. Following its temporary closure during World War II, it was relaunched in 1945 and appeared irregularly between 1945 and 1947. After that it came out bi-monthly from 1947 to 1951. From 1952 it was published monthly again.

During the Soviet period, Iskusstvo Kino was the official magazine for cinema industry in the country. The magazine included editorials by leading Communist Party officials. At the same time, it argued that films should meet the demands by public.

From 1963 the magazine, together with Soviet Screen, began to be published by the newly founded state-funded company Goskino. This was responsible for the coordination of film production and distribution in the Soviet Union.

The magazine offers articles on film theory and film reviews. American scholar Vladimir Padunov contributed to the eightieth anniversary issue of the magazine. In the 1960s Valerii Golovskoi was the editor.

During the 1980s Iskusstvo Kino had a print run of 50,000 copies, while the magazine sold 2,000–3,000 copies in the 1990s. In 2004 the magazine sold 5,000 copies.

Daniil Dondurey was among magazine's editors. He was succeeded by Anton Dolin in 2017. He raised a crowdfunding campaign for publication of the magazine and collected 3 million rubles.

In 2020, Cinema Foundation of Russia refused to sponsor the magazine, a decision Dolin considered a retaliation for his critical reviews of the Foundation-sponsored films. In 2021, Iskusstvo Kino was crowdfunded again, raising 5 mln rubles. In 2022, Dolin was proclaimed a foreign agent by Russian officials for political dissent and fled the country.

The magazine ceased publication in May 2023 and shifted to online distribution.

The magazine was archived by East View Information Services, Inc. based in Minneapolis, Minnesota.

== The editors ==
- Ivan Pyryev (1946)
- Nikolai Lebedev (1947–1949)
- Dmitri Eryomin (1949–1951)
- Vitaly Zhdan (1951–1956)
- Lyudmila Pogozheva (1956–1969)
- Yevgeny Surkov (1969–1982)
- Armen Medvedev (1982–1984)
- Yuri Cherepanov (1984–1986)
- Konstantin Shcherbakov (1987–1992)
- Daniil Dondurey (1993–2017)
- Anton Dolin (2017–2022)
- Stanislav Dedinsky (2022)
- Nikita Kartsev (2023–present)

== See also ==
- List of film periodicals
