= St Petersburg Classical Gymnasium =

St Petersburg Classical Gymnasium №610
- Санкт-Петербургская классическая гимназия №610
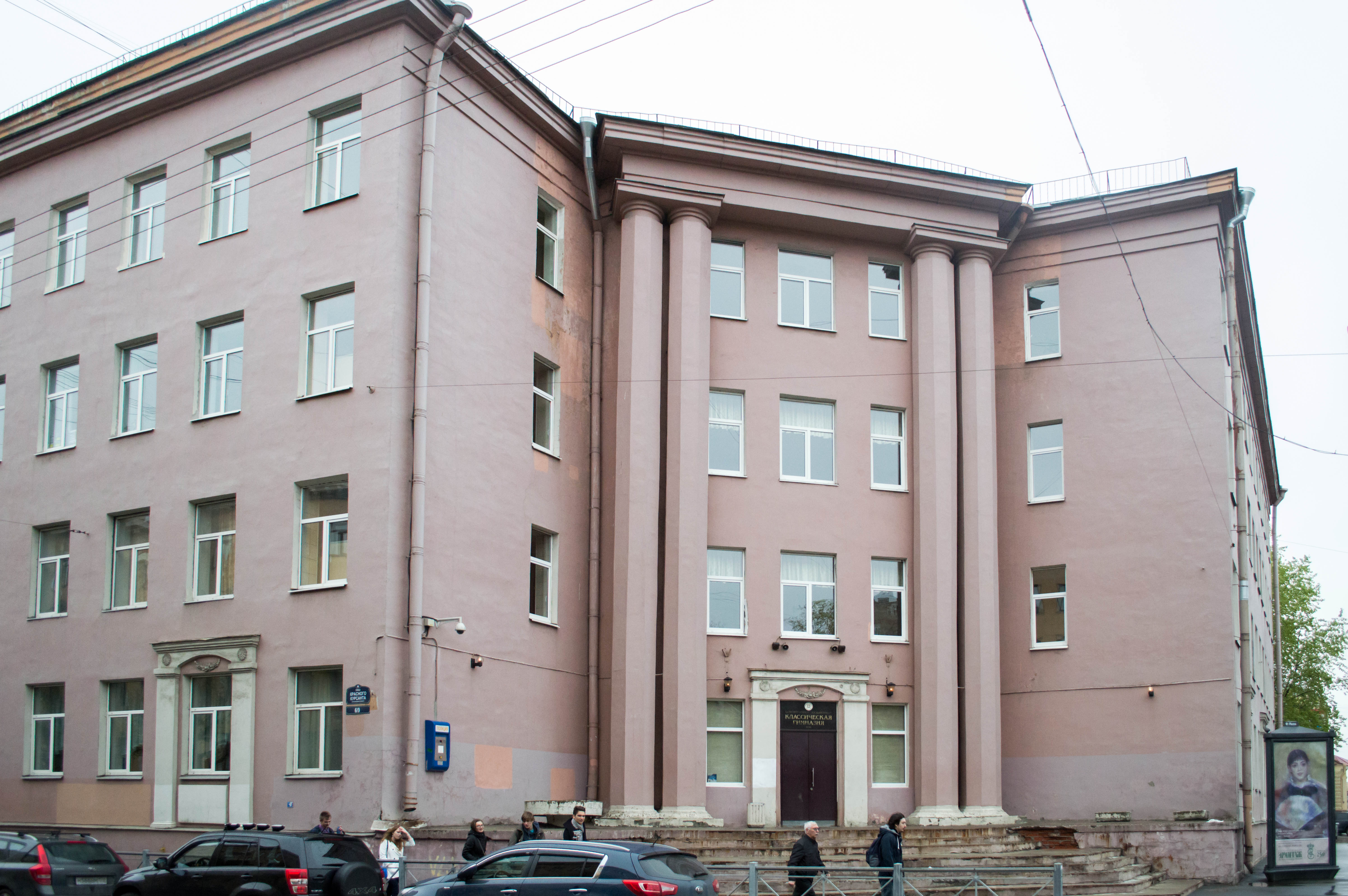
- Saint Petersburg Classical Gymnasium №610

Location
- 9/6, Malyi Prospect P. S. Saint Petersburg, 197198; Russia
- Coordinates: 59°57′18″N 30°17′31″E

Information
- Type: Public, Gymnasium
- Established: 1989
- Principal: Buryachko Sergey Vladimirovich
- Faculty: 118
- Grades: 5–11
- Age: 12 to 18
- Enrollment: 472
- Core Subjects: Latin, Ancient Greek, Math
- Website: http://610.ru/en

St Petersburg Classical Gymnasium is a coeducational public school (# 610) established in 1989 in Saint Petersburg, Russia. It is one of the schools created in St Petersburg after the collapse of the Soviet Union. Formally gymnasium consists of two institutions: secondary school (from 5th to 9th grades) and high school (10th and 11th grades). Up until 2011 there were two classes (around 50 students) enrolled every year, but since then three classes (around 75 students) are formed in the 5th grade. The mission of the school is to teach students how to learn, to develop independent analytical thinking and strengthen their interest in acquiring new knowledge. The school lays an emphasis on ancient languages and maths.

== Governance ==
The general governance is exercised by the elected body of government – Gymnasium Council.

== Admission ==
The admission process is merit-based and consists of special entrance examination (in Russian), which is designed by the school faculty.

== Curriculum ==
The curriculum is based on the model of late 19th – early 20th century Russian classical gymnasia with the following core subjects: Latin and Ancient Greek, English and German, Mathematics.

== Exams ==
As in all other Russian schools, the students take annual exams every June. However, the number of exams in the gymnasium is large and is growing from one in the 5th grade to five in the 9th grade (and later).

Secondary School Annual Exams:

- 5th grade: Latin + Math Test
- 6th grade: Latin, History + Math Test
- 7th grade: Latin, Geometry, English/German + Algebra Test, Biology Test
- 8th grade: Ancient Greek, Russian, Physics, History + Algebra Test, Geography Test
- 9th grade: Math (ГИА), Russian (ГИА), Geometry, Latin, Ancient Greek

High School Annual Exams:

- 10th grade: Literature, English, German, Ancient Greek, Physics, Mathematical Analysis + Chemistry Test
- 11th grade: Math (ЕГЭ), Russian (ЕГЭ), Latin, Ancient Greek

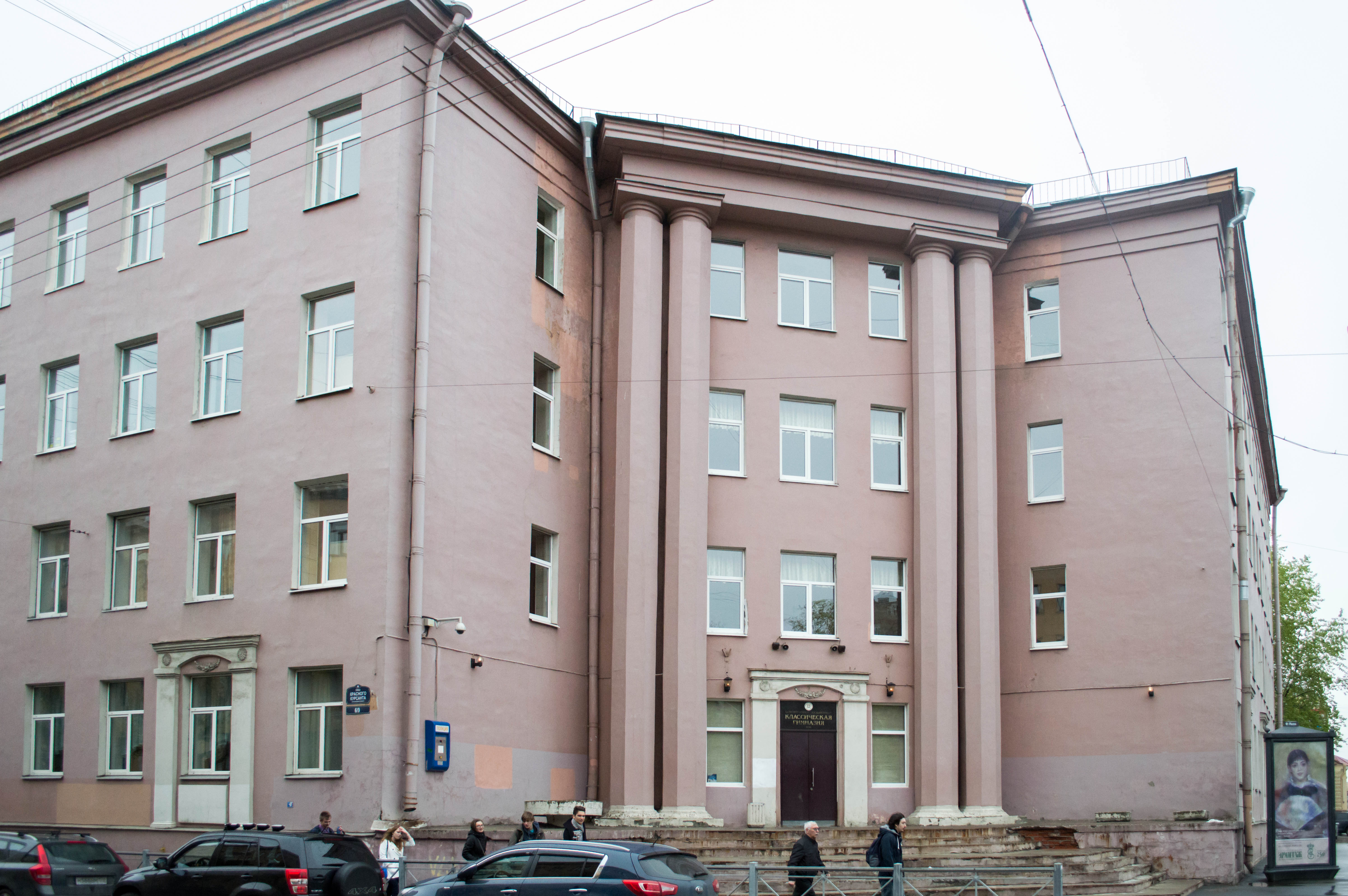
Main Building of the Gymnasium

== Extracurricular activities and clubs ==
There are extracurricular activities and clubs of different character. There are 18 International exchange programs with gymnasia and colleges from few European countries (Germany, Netherlands, Italy, Great Britain).

== Bibliotheca Classica ==
Gymnasium houses a classics reference library, Bibliotheca Classica, which was founded in 1993 as a new independent research center.

== Graduates ==
As of 2020, there are 928 graduates of the Gymnasium. 53 of them are PhD degree holders from leading Russian and international Universities in different academic fields: 24 - in Philology and Linguistics, 10 - in History, Philosophy, Political Science, Law, Pedagogy, 10 - in Medicine, Chemistry, Biology, Bioengineering, Psychology, Geology, 5 - in Mathematics and Physics, 4 - in Economics. Here is the full list in Russian. 12 graduates currently teach and more than 40 have been teaching at the Gymnasium. Again, here is the list of graduates/teachers in Russian.

== Literature ==
Buryachko, Sergey. Saint Petersburg Classical High School (1989 - 2009) // // Humanitas Europae Foundation Website.

Zelchenko, Vsevolod. GYMNASIUM CLASSICUM PETROPOLITANUM (in French) // Humanitas Europae Foundation Website.

Smirnov, Sergei. An Experiment in Revival of the Classical Gymnasium. Lessons and Prospects // Russian Education and Society. Vol. 36, Issue 2, 1994. P. 54 – 68.

Westbrook, Marie A.; Lurie, Lev; Ivanov, Mikhail. The Independent Schools of St. Petersburg. Diversification of Schooling in Postcommunist Russia // Education and Society in the New Russia. Ed. by Anthony Jones. M.E. Sharpe Publishing House, 1994. P. 110 – 112.

Hohn, Kerstin. Homer und Cicero statt Marx und Lenin. Experiment und Wandel an den russischen Schulen und Hochschulen (in German). «Frankfurter Allgemeine Zeitung», 25. Januar 1992.

Barring, Felicity. SOVIET TURMOIL; Joyfully, Improbably, a School Opens in Leningrad. New York Times, September 2, 1991.
