= Vladimir Dubrovskii =

Russian physicist

Vladimir G. Dubrovskii
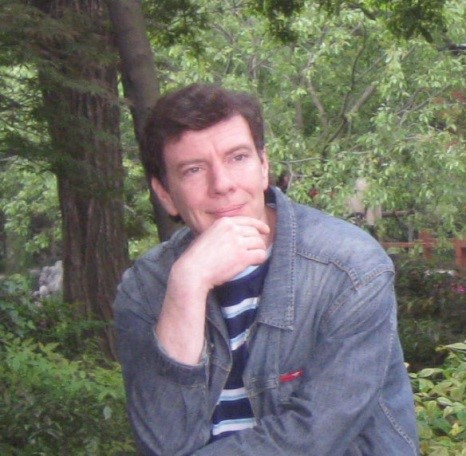
- Born: 15 October 1965 (age 60)
- Citizenship: Russia
- Education: St. Petersburg State University; Leningrad State University (diploma, 1988)
- Known for: Theoretical physics and Physics of nanostructures
- Scientific career
- Fields: Condensed matter physics Semiconductor nanostructures and nanowires Classical nucleation theory
- Workplaces: St. Petersburg Academic University; Ioffe Institute; St. Petersburg State University; ITMO University

Vladimir G. Dubrovskii (Russian: Владимир Германович Дубровский; born in 1965) is the head of Laboratory of physics of nanostructures at St. Petersburg Academic University, a leading research scientist at Ioffe Institute, and a professor at St. Petersburg State University and ITMO University.

== Educational background ==
Dubrovskii graduated from St. Petersburg State University, Department of Statistical Physics, in 1988, with a diploma in theoretical physics. In 1991, he was a post-doc research fellow in Oxford University. He obtained his PhD in 1990 and a doctor of sciences degree in 2002, in condensed matter physics.

== Contributions to physics ==
Dubrovskii has made contributions to several fields of physics.

Semiconductor nanostructures and nanowires

He is best known for growth modeling of semiconductor nanostructures, particularly III-V nanowires. Starting from 2003, he has been at the forefront of research in this field, collaborating with more than 40 groups in 18 countries (with joint publications). His main area is in kinetically controlled engineering of nanostructures, including morphology, crustal phase, and size distributions. In 2005, he and coauthors proved a diffusion-induced character of gold-assisted vapor-liquid-solid (VLS) growth of GaAs nanowires by molecular beam epitaxy [1]. In 2008–2014, following Frank Glas [2], he developed theoretical approaches for understanding and controlling polytypism of III-V nanowires by the growth parameter tuning [3] and catalyst material [4]. This allowed achieving record small GaAs nanowires (down to 5 nm in radius) with pure zincblende structure [5]. Independently of Jerry Tersoff [6], in 2013-2015 he predicted a non-linear focusing effect [7,8] that enabled self-organized ensembles of GaAs nanowires with uniform radii [8]. The works of 2016 brought up the new size distributions describing length statistics in nanowire ensembles [9,10]. In 2015–2016, he developed the first theory for the compositional control of ternary III-V nanowires [11], sharpening their axial heterointerfaces [12] and, more generally, nucleation theory of ternary solids from ternary and quaternary liquid alloys. He contributed into understanding the VLS versus selective area growth of nanowires [13] and self-induced nucleation of GaN nanowires on silicon substrates [14].

Classical nucleation theory

In 2009, Dubrovskii discovered fluctuation-induced broadening (the Dubrovskii broadening) of the size distributions described by a Fokker-Planck type kinetic equation in terms of the Kuni invariant variables [15], and presented a map of the power exponents for the spectrum spreading in 2D and 3D systems. Further studies revealed the influence of kinetic fluctuations on the size distributions of islands and droplets in the stages of their nucleation, growth, and Ostwald ripening [16,17]. He also contributed into binary nucleation theory with a saddle point of the formation energy, with applications in growth theory of strain-induced islands [18] and ternary VLS nanowires.

Statistical size distributions and scaling properties

In 1996, he published exact solution for the infinite set of rate equations for heterogeneous growth with size-linear rate constants [19], reduced to one-parametric Polya distribution. Further investigation of the growth systems with size-linear capture rates led to a two-parametric modified beta-distribution (2015) [20] which acquires the Vicsek-Family scaling form [21] in the continuum limit. Distributions of this type are now widely used for modeling the growth kinetics of semiconductor nanostructures, surface islands and biological objects.

Self-regulated nucleation and growth in nanosystems

Since 2004, Dubrovskii pursued growth theories in confined systems with a limited amount of growth species in the mother phase. He developed concepts of "mononuclear" growth [22,23] whereby individual nucleation events predetermine physical properties of emerging nanomaterials. He developed methods of using different size-dependent effects for narrowing size distributions [8,24-26].
Together with Frank Glas, he predicted narrow sub-Poissonian size distributions [27] in systems with nucleation antibunching [28], and derived analytical asymptotes for their time-independent shapes.

Elastic relaxation and plastic deformation in nanostructures

He and coauthors developed semi-analytical models for elastic relaxation and misfit dislocations in nanostructures grown on lattice-mismatched substrates [29] and contributed into development of epitaxial techniques for monolithic integration of high quality optical III-V nanostructures with silicon electronic platform [8,18,30].

Research style

Dubrovskii prefers analytical calculations to computers and tries to present theoretical models for complex growth behavior in a simple analytic form with a minimum number of physically transparent parameters.

== Current research interests ==
Dubrovskii main areas are currently in modeling and shaping of sophisticated nanowire nanoheterostructures, nucleation theory in the nanoscale, physical chemistry of alloys and compounds, and analytic size distributions. He is working with experimentalists on design and functionalization of optoelectronic nanoheterostructures.

Lecture courses and PhD students

Dubrovskii is lecturing in nucleation theory, epitaxy of nanostructures and growth modeling of nanowires. He has supervised 10 PhD students, 2 of them under European Marie Curie Initial Training Networks.

== Books and book chapters ==
- V. G. Dubrovskii, Growth kinetics of epitaxial nanostructures, Fizmatlit, Moscow (2009) (in Russian).
- V. G. Dubrovskii, Nucleation theory and growth of nanostructures. Springer, Heidelberg – New York – Dordrecht – London, 2014.
- V. G. Dubrovskii, Theory of VLS growth of compound semiconductors. In: A. Fontcuberta i Morral, S. A. Dayeh and C. Jagadish, editors, Semiconductors and Semimetals, v. 93, Burlington: Academic Press, 2015, pp. 1–78.

Articles

[1] Dubrovskii, V. G.; Cirlin, G. E.; Soshnikov, I. P.; Tonkikh, A. A.; Sibirev, N. V.; Samsonenko, Yu. B.; Ustinov, V. M. (2005-05-31). "Diffusion-induced growth of GaAs nanowhiskers during molecular beam epitaxy: Theory and experiment". Physical Review B. 71 (20) 205325. American Physical Society (APS). Bibcode:2005PhRvB..71t5325D. doi:10.1103/physrevb.71.205325. ISSN 1098-0121.
[2] Glas, Frank; Harmand, Jean-Christophe; Patriarche, Gilles (2007-10-05). "Why Does Wurtzite Form in Nanowires of III-V Zinc Blende Semiconductors?". Physical Review Letters. 99 (14) 146101. arXiv:0706.0846. Bibcode:2007PhRvL..99n6101G. doi:10.1103/physrevlett.99.146101. ISSN 0031-9007. PMID 17930689. S2CID 14209075.
[3] Dubrovskii, V. G.; Sibirev, N. V. (2008-01-15). "Growth thermodynamics of nanowires and its application to polytypism of zinc blende III-V nanowires". Physical Review B. 77 (3) 035414. American Physical Society (APS). Bibcode:2008PhRvB..77c5414D. doi:10.1103/physrevb.77.035414. ISSN 1098-0121.
[4] Dubrovskii, V. G.; Cirlin, G. E.; Sibirev, N. V.; Jabeen, F.; Harmand, J. C.; Werner, P. (2011-03-09). "New Mode of Vapor−Liquid−Solid Nanowire Growth". Nano Letters. 11 (3). American Chemical Society (ACS): 1247–1253. Bibcode:2011NanoL..11.1247D. doi:10.1021/nl104238d. ISSN 1530-6984. PMID 21344916.
[5] Gil, Evelyne; Dubrovskii, Vladimir G.; Avit, Geoffrey; André, Yamina; Leroux, Christine; et al. (2014-06-03). "Record Pure Zincblende Phase in GaAs Nanowires down to 5 nm in Radius". Nano Letters. 14 (7). American Chemical Society (ACS): 3938–3944. Bibcode:2014NanoL..14.3938G. doi:10.1021/nl501239h. ISSN 1530-6984. PMID 24873917.
[6] Tersoff, J. (2015-09-21). "Stable Self-Catalyzed Growth of III–V Nanowires". Nano Letters. 15 (10). American Chemical Society (ACS): 6609–6613. Bibcode:2015NanoL..15.6609T. doi:10.1021/acs.nanolett.5b02386. ISSN 1530-6984. PMID 26389697.
[7] Priante, G.; Ambrosini, S.; Dubrovskii, V. G.; Franciosi, A.; Rubini, S. (2013-08-16). "Stopping and Resuming at Will the Growth of GaAs Nanowires". Crystal Growth & Design. 13 (9). American Chemical Society (ACS): 3976–3984. doi:10.1021/cg400701w. ISSN 1528-7483.
[8] Dubrovskii, V. G.; Xu, T.; Álvarez, A. Díaz; Plissard, S. R.; Caroff, P.; Glas, F.; Grandidier, B. (2015-07-22). "Self-Equilibration of the Diameter of Ga-Catalyzed GaAs Nanowires". Nano Letters. 15 (8). American Chemical Society (ACS): 5580–5584. Bibcode:2015NanoL..15.5580D. doi:10.1021/acs.nanolett.5b02226. ISSN 1530-6984. PMID 26189571.
[9] Dubrovskii, Vladimir G.; Berdnikov, Yury; Schmidtbauer, Jan; Borg, Mattias; Storm, Kristian; Deppert, Knut; Johansson, Jonas (2016-03-21). "Length Distributions of Nanowires Growing by Surface Diffusion". Crystal Growth & Design. 16 (4). American Chemical Society (ACS): 2167–2172. doi:10.1021/acs.cgd.5b01832. ISSN 1528-7483.
[10] Dubrovskii, V G; Sibirev, N V; Berdnikov, Y; Gomes, U P; Ercolani, D; Zannier, V; Sorba, L (2016-08-08). "Length distributions of Au-catalyzed and In-catalyzed InAs nanowires". Nanotechnology. 27 (37) 375602. IOP Publishing. Bibcode:2016Nanot..27K5602D. doi:10.1088/0957-4484/27/37/375602. ISSN 0957-4484. PMID 27501469. S2CID 41474044.
[11] Dubrovskii, Vladimir G. (2015-11-19). "Fully Analytical Description for the Composition of Ternary Vapor–Liquid–Solid Nanowires". Crystal Growth & Design. 15 (12). American Chemical Society (ACS): 5738–5743. doi:10.1021/acs.cgd.5b00924. ISSN 1528-7483.
[12] Dubrovskii, V. G.; Sibirev, N. V. (2016-03-23). "Factors Influencing the Interfacial Abruptness in Axial III–V Nanowire Heterostructures". Crystal Growth & Design. 16 (4). American Chemical Society (ACS): 2019–2023. doi:10.1021/acs.cgd.5b01613. ISSN 1528-7483.
[13] Gao, Qian; Dubrovskii, Vladimir G.; Caroff, Philippe; Wong-Leung, Jennifer; Li, Li; Guo, Yanan; Fu, Lan; Tan, Hark Hoe; Jagadish, Chennupati (2016-06-06). "Simultaneous Selective-Area and Vapor–Liquid–Solid Growth of InP Nanowire Arrays". Nano Letters. 16 (7). American Chemical Society (ACS): 4361–4367. Bibcode:2016NanoL..16.4361G. doi:10.1021/acs.nanolett.6b01461. ISSN 1530-6984. PMID 27253040.
[14] Dubrovskii, Vladimir G.; Consonni, Vincent; Trampert, Achim; Geelhaar, Lutz; Riechert, Henning (2012-04-23). "Scaling thermodynamic model for the self-induced nucleation of GaN nanowires". Physical Review B. 85 (16) 165317. American Physical Society (APS). Bibcode:2012PhRvB..85p5317D. doi:10.1103/physrevb.85.165317. ISSN 1098-0121.
[15] Dubrovskii, V. G. (2009-10-28). "Fluctuation-induced spreading of size distribution in condensation kinetics". The Journal of Chemical Physics. 131 (16). AIP Publishing: 164514. Bibcode:2009JChPh.131p4514D. doi:10.1063/1.3254384. ISSN 0021-9606. PMID 19894963.
[16] Dubrovskii, V. G.; Nazarenko, M. V. (2010-03-21). "Nucleation theory beyond the deterministic limit. I. The nucleation stage". The Journal of Chemical Physics. 132 (11). AIP Publishing: 114507. Bibcode:2010JChPh.132k4507D. doi:10.1063/1.3354118. ISSN 0021-9606. PMID 20331305.
[17] Dubrovskii, V. G.; Kazansky, M. A.; Nazarenko, M. V.; Adzhemyan, L. T. (2011-03-07). "Numerical analysis of Ostwald ripening in two-dimensional systems". The Journal of Chemical Physics. 134 (9). AIP Publishing: 094507. Bibcode:2011JChPh.134i4507D. doi:10.1063/1.3556658. ISSN 0021-9606. PMID 21384985.
[18] Dubrovskii, V. G.; Sibirev, N. V.; Zhang, X.; Suris, R. A. (2010). "Stress-Driven Nucleation of Three-Dimensional Crystal Islands: From Quantum Dots to Nanoneedles". Crystal Growth & Design. 10 (9). American Chemical Society (ACS): 3949–3955. doi:10.1021/cg100495b. ISSN 1528-7483.
[19] Dubrovsky, V. G. (1996). "On an exact solution of master equations for the model of reversible growth". Theoretical and Mathematical Physics. 108 (2). Springer Science and Business Media LLC: 1110–1118. Bibcode:1996TMP...108.1110D. doi:10.1007/bf02070679. ISSN 0040-5779. S2CID 123369783.
[20] Dubrovskii, V. G.; Sibirev, N. V. (2015-04-29). "Analytic scaling function for island-size distributions". Physical Review E. 91 (4) 042408. American Physical Society (APS). Bibcode:2015PhRvE..91d2408D. doi:10.1103/physreve.91.042408. ISSN 1539-3755. PMID 25974509.
[21] Vicsek, Tamás; Family, Fereydoon (1984-05-07). "Dynamic Scaling for Aggregation of Clusters". Physical Review Letters. 52 (19). American Physical Society (APS): 1669–1672. Bibcode:1984PhRvL..52.1669V. doi:10.1103/physrevlett.52.1669. ISSN 0031-9007.
[22] Dubrovskii, Vladimir G.; Sibirev, Nickolai V. (2004-09-15). "Growth rate of a crystal facet of arbitrary size and growth kinetics of vertical nanowires". Physical Review E. 70 (3) 031604. American Physical Society (APS). Bibcode:2004PhRvE..70c1604D. doi:10.1103/physreve.70.031604. ISSN 1539-3755. PMID 15524531.
[23] Dubrovskii, V.G.; Grecenkov, J. (2014-12-02). "Zeldovich Nucleation Rate, Self-Consistency Renormalization, and Crystal Phase of Au-Catalyzed GaAs Nanowires". Crystal Growth & Design. 15 (1). American Chemical Society (ACS): 340–347. doi:10.1021/cg5014208. ISSN 1528-7483.
[24] Dubrovskii, V. G.; Xu, T.; Lambert, Y.; Nys, J.-P.; Grandidier, B.; Stiévenard, D.; Chen, W.; Pareige, P. (2012-03-05). "Narrowing the Length Distribution of Ge Nanowires". Physical Review Letters. 108 (10) 105501. American Physical Society (APS). Bibcode:2012PhRvL.108j5501D. doi:10.1103/physrevlett.108.105501. ISSN 0031-9007. PMID 22463421.
[25] Dubrovskii, V. G. (2013-05-14). "Self-regulated pulsed nucleation in catalyzed nanowire growth". Physical Review B. 87 (19) 195426. American Physical Society (APS). Bibcode:2013PhRvB..87s5426D. doi:10.1103/physrevb.87.195426. ISSN 1098-0121.
[26] Dubrovskii, V. G. (2016-05-23). "Kinetic narrowing of size distribution". Physical Review B. 93 (17) 174203. American Physical Society (APS). Bibcode:2016PhRvB..93q4203D. doi:10.1103/physrevb.93.174203. ISSN 2469-9950.
[27] F. Glas and V. G. Dubrovskii, Phys. Rev. B, submitted (2017).
[28] Glas, Frank; Harmand, Jean-Christophe; Patriarche, Gilles (2010-03-31). "Nucleation Antibunching in Catalyst-Assisted Nanowire Growth". Physical Review Letters. 104 (13) 135501. American Physical Society (APS). Bibcode:2010PhRvL.104m5501G. doi:10.1103/physrevlett.104.135501. ISSN 0031-9007. PMID 20481891.
[29] Zhang, Xu; Dubrovskii, Vladimir G.; Sibirev, Nickolay V.; Ren, Xiaomin (2011-12-07). "Analytical Study of Elastic Relaxation and Plastic Deformation in Nanostructures on Lattice Mismatched Substrates". Crystal Growth & Design. 11 (12). American Chemical Society (ACS): 5441–5448. doi:10.1021/cg201029x. ISSN 1528-7483.
[30] Ng, Kar Wei; Ko, Wai Son; Tran, Thai-Truong D.; Chen, Roger; Nazarenko, Maxim V.; Lu, Fanglu; Dubrovskii, Vladimir G.; Kamp, Martin; Forchel, Alfred; Chang-Hasnain, Connie J. (2012-12-20). "Unconventional Growth Mechanism for Monolithic Integration of III–V on Silicon". ACS Nano. 7 (1). American Chemical Society (ACS): 100–107. doi:10.1021/nn3028166. ISSN 1936-0851. PMID 23240995.

== Appointments and memberships ==
- Semiconductor Science and Technology journal, member of editorial board (since 2017)
- Nanomaterials and Nanotechnology journal, member of editorial board (since 2016)
- Technical Physics Letters, member of editorial board (since 2011)
- International Nano-Optoelectronic Workshop, member of Steering Committee (since 2010)
- Nanowire Week, member of Steering Committee (since 2011)
- Euro MBE conference, member of International Program Committee (since 2017)
- International symposium "Nanostructures: Physics and Technology", member of International Program Committee (since 2008)
- French-Russian associated international laboratory "Nanostructures of Compound Semiconductors: Growth, Properties, Devices", Russian scientist-in-charge.
- Zh. I. Alferov Russian-Chinese joint laboratory of information optoelectronics and nanoheterostructures, deputy director (from 2010).

== Publication record ==
Dubrovskii has authored and co-authored more than 600 research papers in leading technical journals and conferences, with more than 250 journal papers indexed by WoS. His Hirsh-index is 40 (WoS).

== Honors ==
- Chevalier of Ordre des Palmes académiques, France (2017).
- Guest professor at Clermont Université, Clermont-Ferrand, France (2014).
- Regular high-level visiting scientist in the International Guest Academic Talents (IGAT) Base at Beijing University of Posts and Telecommunications, China (2007–2016).
- Distinguished Visiting Fellow of the Royal Academy of Engineering, Durham University, UK (2010).
