= Yurasov =

Yurasov (Russian: Юрасов) is a Russian masculine surname, its feminine counterpart is Yurasova. Notable people with the surname include:

- Dmitry Yurasov (born 1964), Russian historian and human rights defender
- Vera Yurasova (1928–2023), Russian physicist
