= Unipolar motor =

Unipolar motor may refer to:

- Homopolar motor, a primitive electric motor
- Unipolar stepper motor, a type of stepper motor
