= Ioffe Institute =

Russian research centre

The Ioffe Institute
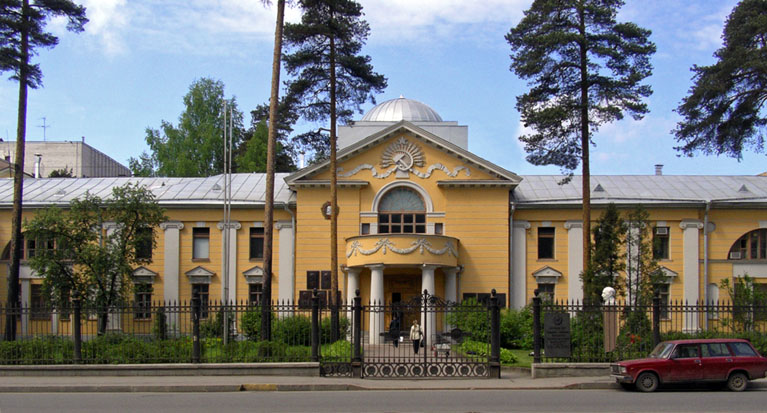
- Formation: 1918; 108 years ago
- Headquarters: Saint Petersburg, Russia
- Coordinates: 60°00′24.63″N 30°22′07.72″E
- Members: Russian Academy of Sciences
- Official languages: Russian and English
- Director: Sergei Ivanov
- Website: www.ioffe.ru

The Ioffe Physical-Technical Institute of the Russian Academy of Sciences (for short, Ioffe Institute, Russian: Физико-технический институт им. А. Ф. Иоффе, romanized: Fiziko-tekhnicheskiy institut im. A. F. Ioffe) is one of Russia's largest research centers specialized in physics and technology. The institute was established in 1918 in Petrograd (now St. Petersburg) and ran for several decades by Abram Ioffe. The institute is a member of the Russian Academy of Sciences. As of June 2024 the Ioffe Institute employed 1977 individuals including both scientific and non-scientific staff.

== Present structure of the institute ==
As of 2019, the Ioffe institute employed about 1500 people, around 1000 of whom were scientific researchers (including 560 with a PhD degree and 250 with a Doktor Nauk degree). Most of the research staff members are top graduates of the St. Petersburg (former Leningrad) universities.

From 2013 until mid-May 2018 the Ioffe institute was under formal jurisdiction of the Federal Agency for Scientific Organizations (FASO Russia), now it is under jurisdiction of the established in May 2018 Ministry of Science and Higher Education, like all other institutions of the Russian Academy of Sciences (RAS).

The institute is organized into five divisions:

- Center for Nano-Heterostructure Physics
- Solid State Electronics
- Solid State Physics
- Plasma Physics, Atomic Physics and Astrophysics
- Physics of Dielectrics and Semiconductors

Each of the divisions includes several laboratories. The institute has its own graduate school and a scientific council. There exists an intensive collaboration with the research and industrial establishments in Russia and worldwide.

The institute publishes five scientific journals: Semiconductors (Russian: Физика и техника полупроводников), Physics of the Solid State (Russian: Физика твёрдого тела), Optics and Spectroscopy (Russian: Оптика и спектроскопия), and Technical Physics (journal + letters) (Russian: Журнал технической физики (основной + письма)).

== Founding of the institute ==
The foundation date of the Ioffe Institute is September 23, 1918 – the day of signing the decree on the establishment of the physical and technical department in the (established in March of the same year) State Roentgenological and Radiological Institute in Petrograd. Despite tremendous economic problems after the World War I and the October Revolution (1917), the development of science was one of the priorities of the new Communist government.

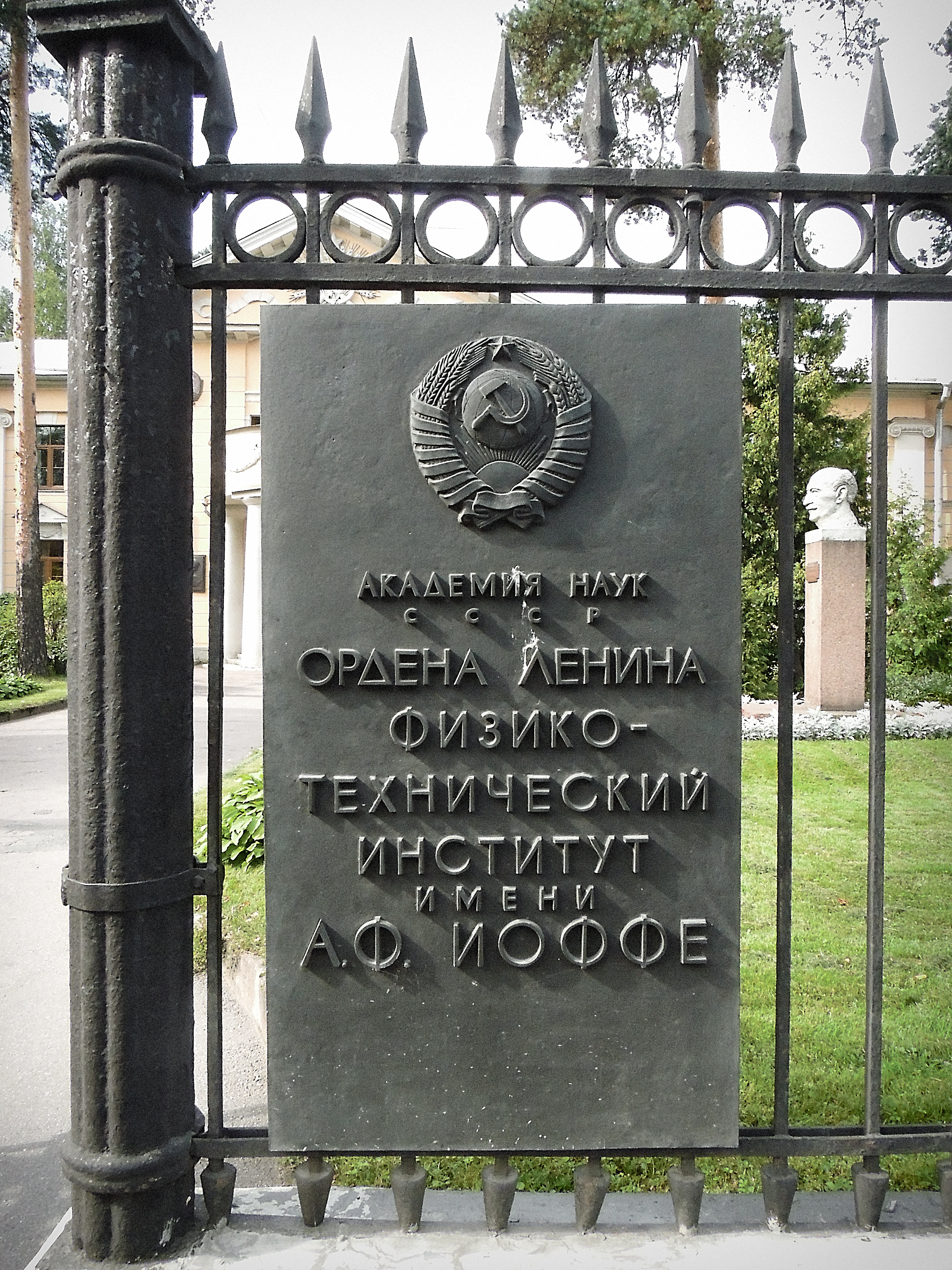
The entrance plaque, preserved from the Soviet times

The abovementioned department was headed by A. F. Ioffe. In 1922, on its basis, the State Physicotechnical Radiology Institute has emerged. After several reorganizations and renaming, since 1933, the institute became “Leningrad Physicotechnical Institute”. The form “Physicotechnical” is a Russian variant for “Physical & Technical”. Three decades later, in the 1960s, the word “Ioffe” was added to the institute name, in honor of the first director.

Since 1939, the institute has been a member of the Academy of Sciences of the USSR (since 1991 – of the Russian Academy of Sciences). In 1967, it was awarded the Order of Lenin. These details were reflected in the institute name, especially in Russian. Also now, for historical reasons, there remained the entrance plaque (s. photo): “Academy of Sciences of the USSR, A. F. Ioffe Physicotechnical Institute, awarded the Order of Lenin” (Russian: Oрдена Ленина Физико-технический институт им. А. Ф. Иоффе АН СССР).

Presently, in English texts, for example in scientific papers, the name “[А. F.] Ioffe [Physical-Technical] Institute [of the Russian Academy of Sciences]” is used (the optional fragments are enclosed in square brackets).

== Main scientific achievements ==
Scientists such as Lev Landau and Pyotr Kapitsa began their careers there, while many other physicists—including Yakov Zeldovich, Igor Kurchatov, and Igor Tamm—worked at the institute.

The research of the institute covers nearly all fields of the contemporary physics, including the solid-state, semiconductors, quantum electronics, astrophysics, plasma, fluid dynamics, cosmology, nuclear synthesis.

More than 100 employees of the institute were recognized by awarding the highest prizes and orders of the Soviet Union and of those of Russia – in particular the Lenin Prize and USSR State Prize, State Prize of the Russian Federation, Government prizes and special prizes of the Soviet Academy of Sciences and Russian Academy of Sciences.

Twice, the Nobel Prize was awarded for the works performed at the Ioffe Institute. In 1956, academician N. N. Semyonov (together with C. N. Hinshelwood) got the Nobel Prize in Chemistry for a discovery and study of chain reactions: the works were made and published in 1927, when N. N. Semyonov was a staff member of the institute. In 2000, Zh. I. Alferov, director of the Ioffe Institute at that time, became a Nobel Prize laureate in Physics (together with H. Kroemer and J. Kilby) for the development of semiconductor heterostructures for high-speed optoelectronics.

The Ioffe Institute has played a central role in the development of photovoltaic solar power in Russia and internationally, and thus in the development of renewable energy.

== Buildings ==
The main building of the Ioffe Institute (s. photo at the top of the article and the very left part of the photo below) is located at Polytechnicheskaya Street, 26. It was built in a Neoclassicism style in 1912–1916 by the architect G. D. Grimm and served as "a refuge for the elderly needy hereditary noblemen in commemoration of the 300th anniversary of the Romanovs' house" at the forty-prized ones, on the second floor they arranged Church (now the Small Assembly Hall of the institute).

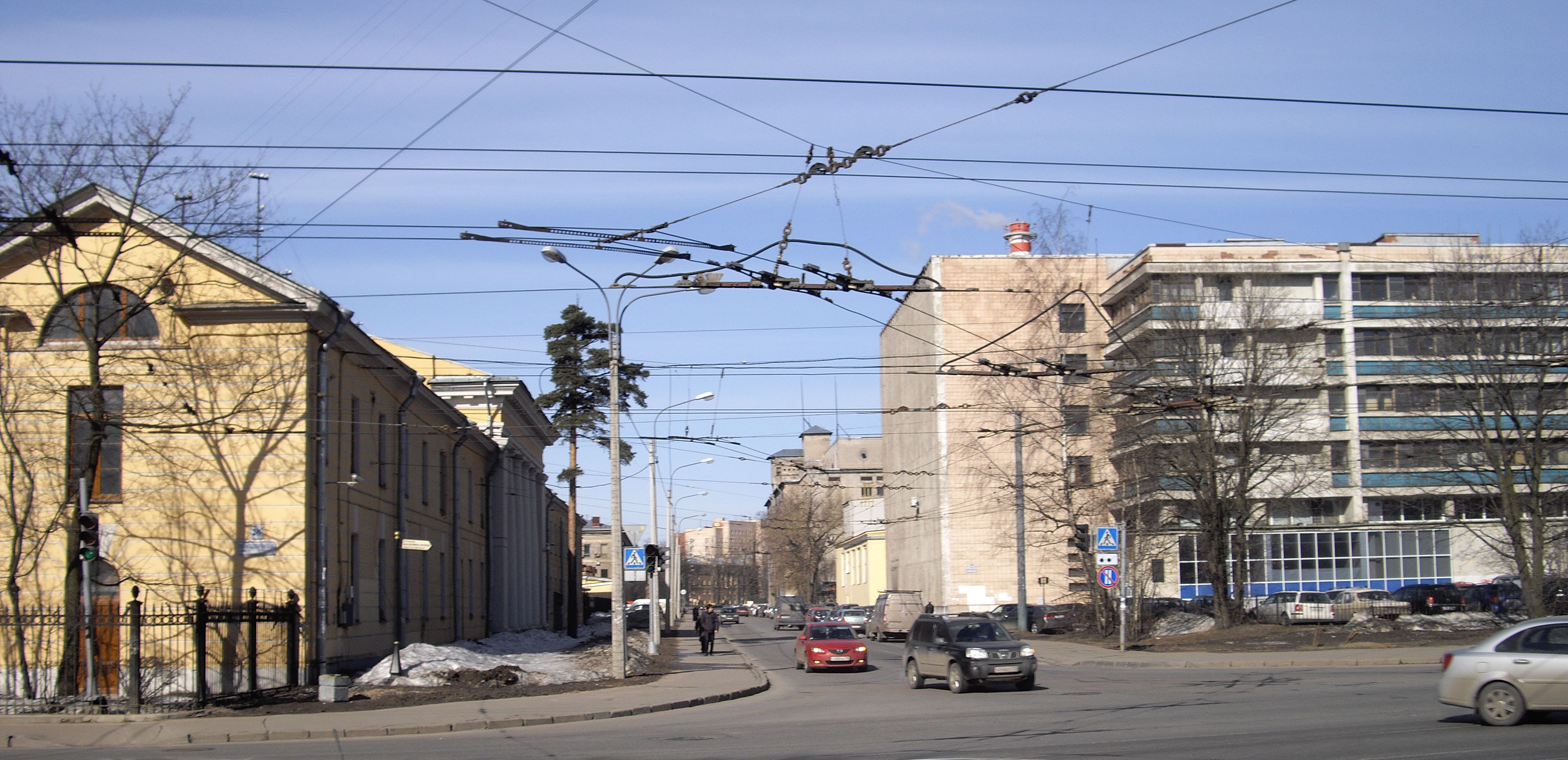
Buildings belonging to the Ioffe Institute; this photo was shot from the Academician Ioffe square

In 1920 the building was adapted to the institute by the design of civil engineers P. I. Sidorov and Yu. V. Bilinsky. The ceremonial transfer of the building to the institute took place on February 4, 1923. Until 1953, the apartment of A. F. Ioffe was located in the same building. In the years 1927–1928 there appeared a yard part, and in 1970 the building was reconstructed and expanded along Kurchatov Street.

Beyond this historical building, a more modern building on another side of the Kurchatov Street (the right part of the photo) also belongs to the Ioffe Institute. It was constructed in the 1970s. Furthermore, some laboratories of the Ioffe Institute are placed in Shuvalovo, a north-west outskirts of St. Petersburg.

In front of the main facade are the busts of Abram Ioffe (sculptor G. D. Glickman, 1964) and Boris Konstantinov (sculptor Mikhail Anikushin, 1975). On either side of the main entrance are memorial plaques: to the left of the entrance are S. N. Zhurkov, Yulii Borisovich Khariton, Anatoly Alexandrov, Yakov Frenkel, and V. M. Tuchkevich; right of the entrance - Igor Kurchatov, B. P. Konstantinov, Nikolay Semyonov.

== Directors of the institute ==
- Before 1950 – Abram Ioffe
- 1950-1957 – Anton Komar
- 1957-1967 – Boris Konstantinov
- 1967-1987 – Vladimir Tuchkevich
- 1987-2003 – Zhores Alferov
- 2003-2017 – Andrey Zabrodskii
- January-September, 2018 – Sergei Lebedev (acting)
- Since October 2018 – Sergei Ivanov (acting through July 2019, official since August 2019)

== Notable people associated with the institute ==
- Hasan Abdullayev
- Anatoly Alexandrov
- Zhores Alferov
- Artem Alikhanian
- Abraham Alikhanov
- Andrei Anselm
- Arkady Aronov
- Lev Artsimovich
- Matvei Bronstein
- Victor Bursian
- Yuri Denisyuk
- Edward Drobyshevski
- Alexey Ekimov
- Oleg Firsov
- Georgy Flyorov
- Vladimir Fock
- Yakov Frenkel
- George Gamow
- Dmitri Garbuzov
- Nina Goryunova
- Vladimir Gribov
- Evgeni Gross
- Abram Ioffe
- Pyotr Kapitsa
- Yulii Khariton
- Boris Konstantinov
- Nikolay Krylov
- Igor Kurchatov
- Georgii Kurdyumov
- Lev Landau
- Vladimir Lobashev
- Vladimir Perel
- Gregory Pikus
- Nikolay Semyonov
- Alexandr Shalnikov
- Lev Shubnikov
- Dmitri Skobeltsyn
- Robert Suris
- Boris Tsarenkov
