= Ball bearing motor =

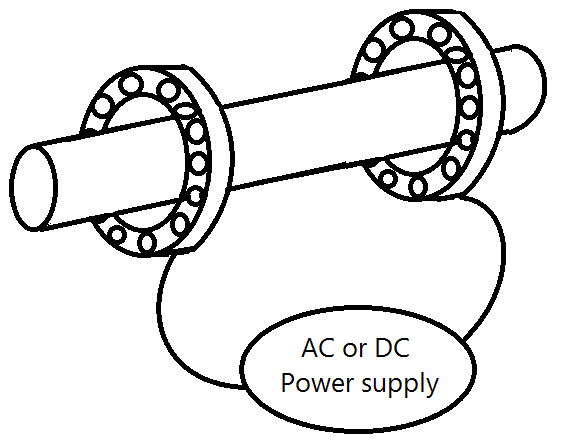
Simplified ball bearing motor (R. A. Milroy used a flywheel at the end of the shaft)

A ball bearing motor or ball-race motor is an electric motor consisting of two ball bearings assembled on a conductive common shaft with provision for passing electric current between two outer bearing races. The motor is usually not self-starting and must be given an initial rotation to start. When a large current is passed through the device, an electromechanical effect, called Huber effect, causes the motor to maintain the rotation. The effect is a complex physical phenomenon, its nature was still subject of a scientific debate in the early 2020s.

A macroscopic scale ball bearing motor is "completely impractical", as heating (due to very low efficiency) and sparking will cause it to self-destruct in seconds if operated in the air.

== History ==
=== Huber effect ===
Jacob Huber had discovered the eponymous electromechanical effect in 1959, when he investigated wheelsets moving on rails: if a voltage differential is applied to the rails (and a large electric current passes from one rail to another through the wheelset) then the initial rotation of the wheels causes a force to appear that supports the initial motion. Huber assumed the force to have an electromagnetic nature, but it is not borne out by the experimental results (the force does not depend on either the direction of motion or electric polarity of the current).

=== Ball bearing motor ===
A ball-bearing implementation spinning at 1000 RPM was made by R. A. Milroy in December of 1959 (unaware of Huber's work at the time, published in 1967).

Kosyrev et al. in 1963 proposed a single-bearing design where the voltage is applied to the inner and outer tracks.

== Explanation of Huber effect ==
There are multiple explanations of the effect, see the large bibliography in McDonald's work.

In 1965 Electronics and Power magazine published a letter by RH Barker asking for an explanation of how this type of motor worked. At the time various explanations had been offered. S. Marinov suggests that the device produces motion from electricity without magnetism being involved, operating purely by the resistance heating causing an asymmetric thermal expansion of the balls in the bearings as they rotate. The same explanation is given by Watson, Patel and Sedcole for rotating cylinders (instead of balls). However, H. Gruenberg has given a thorough theoretical explanation based on pure electromagnetism (and neglecting the thermal effects completely). Also, P. Hatzikonstantinou and P. G. Moyssides claim to have found an excellent agreement between the results from the electromagnetic theory and the experiments measuring the total power and efficiency of the motor.

== See also ==
- Homopolar generator
- Homopolar motor
- Faraday paradox

== Sources ==
- Huber, Jakob (1959). "Elektrodynamische Kraftwirkungen an einem auf Eisenbahnschienen beweglichen Radsatz" [Electrodynamic force effects on a wheelset moving on railway tracks]. Elektrotechnik und Maschinenbau (in German). 76 (8). Wien: 169–174.
- McDonald, Kirk T. (June 1, 2020). "Ball-Bearing Motor" (PDF). Princeton, NJ: Joseph Henry Laboratories, Princeton University.
- Milroy, R. A. (June 1967). "Discussion of 'Hydrodynamic Gyroscope'". Journal of Applied Mechanics. 34 (2): 525. doi:10.1115/1.3607733.
- Shen, Yullia; Tay, Boon K.; Thompson, Benjamin; Soong, Wen L.; Davis, Bruce R.; Abbott, Derek (1999-09-29). "Huber effect and its application to micromotors". In Bergmann, Neil W.; Reinhold, Olaf; Tien, Norman C. (eds.). Electronics and Structures for MEMS. Vol. 3891. pp. 178–183. doi:10.1117/12.364436.
- Sinelnikov, N. N. (1994). "The Huber effect". Technical Physics. 38. American Institute of Physics: 1028.
