= Peter Barlow (mathematician) =

English mathematician and physicist (1776–1862)

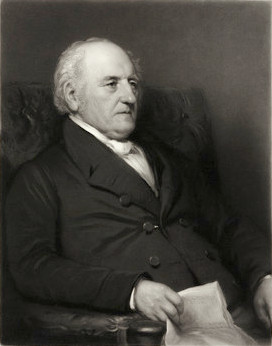
- Peter Barlow
- Born: 13 October 1776; Norwich, Norfolk
- Died: 1 March 1862 (aged 85); Charlton, London
- Known for: Barlow lens Barlow's wheel Barlow's formula Barlow's Tables
- Awards: Copley Medal (1825)
- Scientific career
- Fields: Mathematics, physics, engineering

Peter Barlow (13 October 1776 – 1 March 1862) was an English mathematician and physicist.

== Work in mathematics ==
In 1801, Barlow was appointed assistant mathematics master at the Royal Military Academy, Woolwich, and retained this post until 1847. He contributed articles on mathematics to The Ladies' Diary as well as publishing books such as:

- An Elementary Investigation of the Theory of Numbers (1811)
- A New Mathematical and Philosophical Dictionary (1814)
- New Mathematical Tables (1814)

The latter became known as Barlow's Tables and gives squares, cubes, square roots, cube roots, and reciprocals of all integer numbers from 1 to 10,000. These tables were regularly reprinted until 1965, when computers rendered them obsolete. He contributed to Rees's Cyclopædia articles on Algebra, Analysis, Geometry and Strength of Materials. Barlow also contributed largely to the Encyclopædia Metropolitana.

== Work in physics and engineering ==
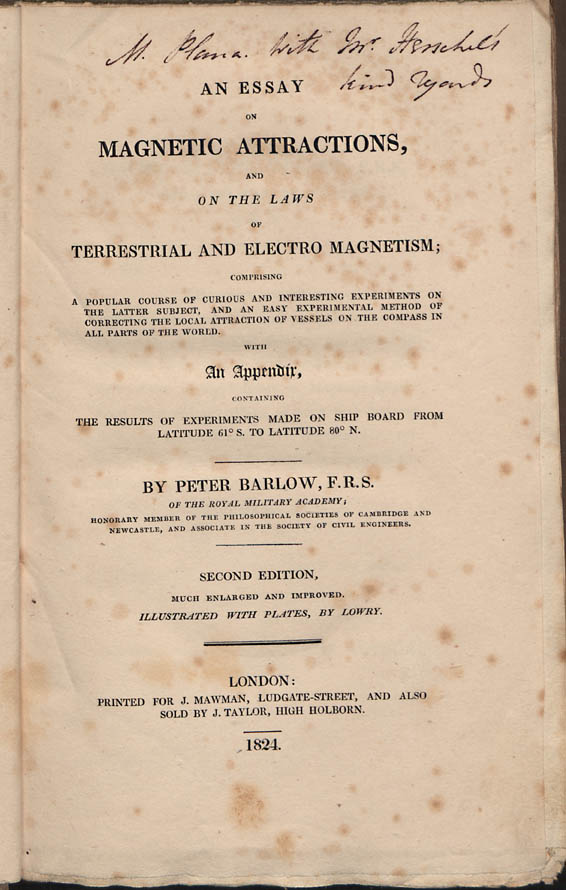
Essay on magnetic attractions, and on the laws of terrestrial and electro magnetism, 1824

In collaboration (1827–1832) with optician George Dollond, Barlow built an achromatic lens that utilized liquid carbon disulfide. (Achromatic lenses were important optical elements of improved telescopes.) After Joseph von Fraunhofer had developed improved glassmaking methods in Germany, Barlow in 1833 improved on Dollond's original design of an achromatic combination by joining flint glass and crown glass to form a doublet lens. Modern optical systems exhibit a vast variance of designs, but most of their elements are still of the flint/crown-doublet type.

Modern astronomy and photography is familiar with a so-called Barlow lens, an optical element which is sometimes used to increase magnification, but can also improve achromatism.

In 1823, he was made a fellow of the Royal Society. Two years later, he received its Copley Medal for his work on correcting the deviation in ship compasses caused by the presence of iron in the hull. Some of his magnetic research was done in collaboration with Samuel Hunter Christie. He conducted early experimental and observational studies on the origins of terrestrial magnetism. He is credited with Barlow's wheel (an early homopolar electric motor) and with Barlow's law (an incorrect formula of electrical conductance).

Barlow investigated a suggestion made by André-Marie Ampère in 1820 that an electromagnetic telegraph could be made by deflecting a compass needle with an electric current. In 1824 Barlow proclaimed the idea impractical after he found that the effect on the compass seriously diminished "with only 200 feet of wire". Barlow, and other eminent scientists of the time who agreed with him, have subsequently been criticised for retarding the development of the telegraph. A decade passed between Ampère's paper being read at the Paris Academy of Sciences and William Ritchie building the first demonstration electromagnetic telegraph. In Barlow's defence, Ampère's design did not enclose the compass in a multiplying coil, as Ritchie's demonstrator did, so the effect would have been very weak at a distance.

Steam locomotion received much attention at Barlow's hands and he sat on the railway commissions of 1836, 1839, 1842 and 1845. He also conducted several investigations for the newly formed Railway Inspectorate in the early 1840s.

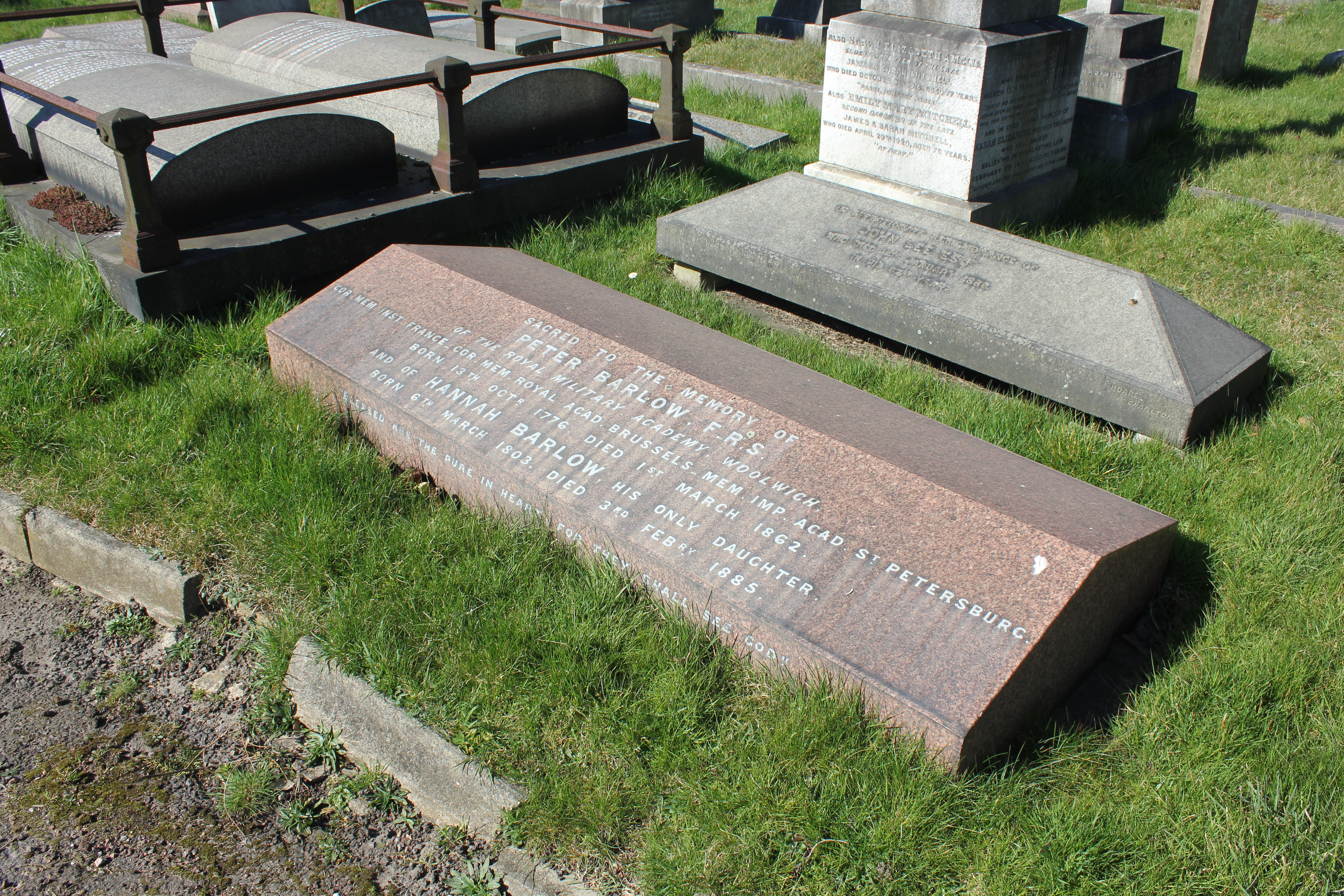
Peter Barlow FRS – gravestone in Charlton Cemetery, London SE7

Barlow made several contributions to the theory of strength of materials, including Essay on the strength and stress of timber (1817) which contains experimental data collected at Woolwich. The sixth edition (1867) of this work was prepared by Barlow's two sons after his death and contains a biography of their father. Barlow also applied his knowledge of materials to the design of bridges. His sons Peter W. Barlow and William Henry Barlow became notable civil engineers of the 19th century. He was elected a Foreign Honorary Member of the American Academy of Arts and Sciences in 1832.

Following his death in 1862 at his home in Charlton, he was buried in Charlton Cemetery.

== See also ==
- 2147483647, Barlow commented on this Mersenne prime
