= Barlow's wheel =

Early demonstration of an electric motor

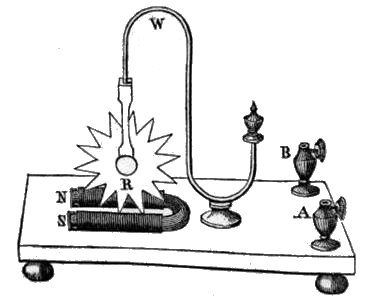
An 1842 diagram of Barlow's wheel

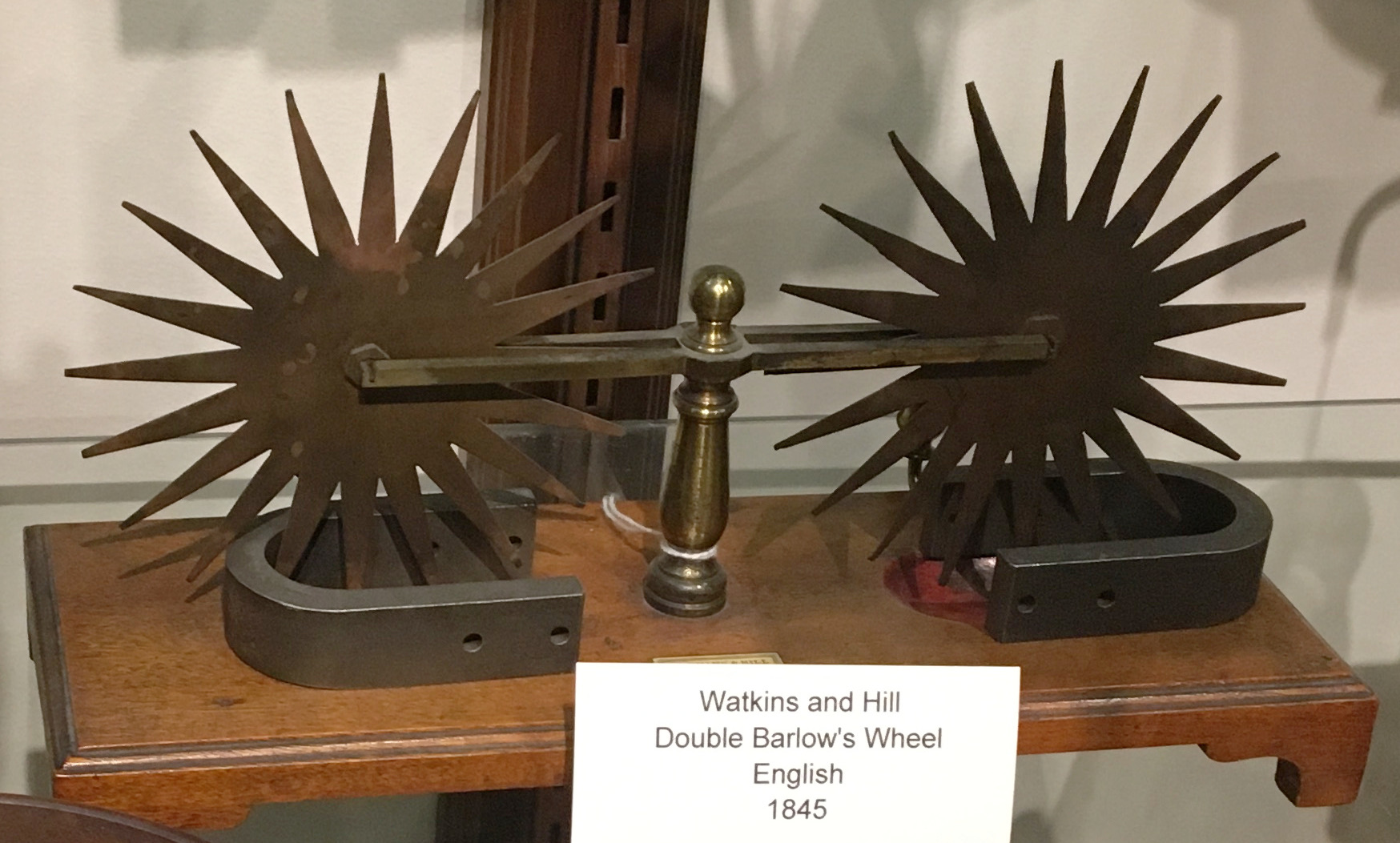
Model with two wheels in series, manufactured in 1845 for educational use

Barlow's wheel was an early demonstration of a homopolar motor, designed and built by English mathematician and physicist Peter Barlow in 1822. It consists of a star-shaped wheel free to turn, suspended over a trough of the liquid metal mercury, with the points dipping into the mercury, between the poles of a horseshoe magnet. A direct electric current passes from the hub of the wheel, through the wheel into the mercury and out through an electrical contact dipping into the mercury. The Lorentz force of the magnetic field on the moving charges in the wheel causes the wheel to rotate.

The points of the wheel, R, dip into mercury contained in a groove hollowed in the stand. A more rapid revolution will be obtained if a small electro-magnet be substituted for a steel magnet, as is shown in the cut. The electro-magnet is fixed to the stand, and included in the circuit with the spur-wheel, so that the current flows through them in succession. Hence, the direction of the rotation will not be changed by reversing that of the current; since the polarity of the electromagnet will also be reversed.

— Excerpt taken from the 1842 edition of the Manual of Magnetism, page 94

It is used as a demonstration of electromagnetism in physics education. Because mercury is toxic, brine is sometimes used in place of mercury in modern recreations of the experiment.

== How it works ==
Action of a magnet on current and how rotational motion is produced due to this can be shown by Barlow's wheel experiment. The apparatus consists of a star-shaped copper wheel capable of rotating freely in a vertical plane about a horizontal axis. The point of each spoke of the star just dips into a pool of mercury kept in a small groove on the wooden base of the apparatus.

The pool of mercury is kept in between the two opposite poles of a strong magnet.

The wheel then rotates with its plane being perpendicular to the direction of the magnetic field, and during its rotation only one point of the star dips into the pool of mercury at a time.

When the axis of the wheel and the mercury are connected to electric cell, the circuit is completed through the axis of the wheel (when a point dips in the mercury) and the mercury.

On passing current through the circuit, the wheel will begin to rotate due to the action of the magnet on the current. The direction of rotation of the wheel can be determined by applying Fleming's left-hand rule. While rotating and when a spoke of the wheel just leaves the mercury, the circuit breaks, but due to inertia of motion, the wheel continues its motion and brings the next spoke in contact with the mercury, thereby restoring the electrical contact. In this way rotation of the wheel continues.

On reversing the direction of the current or that of the magnetic field the wheel rotates in the opposite direction. The speed of rotation depends upon the strength of the magnetic field and the strength of the current. Here mechanical energy is obtained from electrical energy.
