= Barlow's law =

1825 theory of electrical conductance

Barlow's law is an incorrect physical law proposed by Peter Barlow in 1825 to describe the ability of wires to conduct electricity. It says that the strength of the effect of electricity passing through a wire varies inversely with the square root of its length and directly with the square root of its cross-sectional area, or, in modern terminology:

$$I \propto \sqrt\frac{A}{L},$$

where I is electric current, A is the cross-sectional area of the wire, and L is the length of the wire. Barlow formulated his law in terms of the diameter d of a cylindrical wire. Since A is proportional to the square of d the law becomes $I \propto d/\sqrt{L}$ for cylindrical wires.

Barlow undertook his experiments with the aim of determining whether long-distance telegraphy was feasible and believed that he proved that it was not. The publication of Barlow's law delayed research into telegraphy for several years, until 1831 when Joseph Henry and Philip Ten Eyck constructed a circuit 1,060 feet long, which used a large battery to activate an electromagnet. Barlow did not investigate the dependence of the current strength on electric tension (that is, voltage). He endeavoured to keep this constant, but admitted there was some variation. Barlow was not entirely certain that he had found the correct law, writing "the discrepancies are rather too great to enable us to say, with confidence, that such is the law in question."

In 1827, Georg Ohm published a different law, in which current varies inversely with the wire's length, not its square root; that is,

$$I \propto \frac{1}{c + L/A},$$

where $c$ is a constant dependent on the circuit setup. Ohm's law is now considered the correct law, and Barlow's false.

The law Barlow proposed was not in error due to poor measurement; in fact, it fits Barlow's careful measurements quite well. Heinrich Lenz pointed out that Ohm took into account "all the conducting resistances … of the circuit", whereas Barlow did not. Ohm explicitly included a term for what we would now call the internal resistance of the battery. Barlow did not have this term and approximated the results with a power law instead. Ohm's law in modern usage is rarely stated with this explicit term, but nevertheless an awareness of it is necessary for a full understanding of the current in a circuit.
