= Boris Konstantinov =

Soviet physicist (1910–1969)

Boris Pavlovich Konstantinov (Russian: Борис Павлович Константинов; July 6, 1910 – July 9, 1969) was a Soviet physicist who specialized in thermonuclear fuel processing and have written numerous works on acoustics and on both corpuscular and optical plasma diagnostics. He was a graduate of Ioffe Institute. In 1953 he became corresponding member of the Academy of Sciences of the Soviet Union and by 1960 became its full member. In 1967 he became its Vice-President of the Academy at which position he served till his death in 1969.
