= Arkady Aronov =

Israeli-Russian physicist (1939–1994)

- ארקדי ארונוב
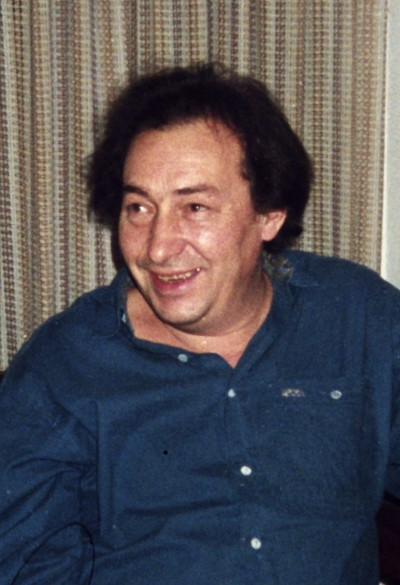
- Arkady Aronov in 1990s
- Born: July 26, 1939
- Died: November 13, 1994 (aged 55)
- Education: Leningrad Electrotechnical Institute; Institute of Semiconductors of Russian Academy of Sciences
- Awards: Humboldt Prize; Hewlett Packard Europhysics Prize
- Scientific career
- Fields: Physics
- Workplaces: Karlsruhe Institute of Technology
- Thesis: Magnetic phenomena in crossed electric and magnetic fields (1966)
- Doctoral advisor: Grigory Pikus
- Notable students: Boris Altshuler, Boris Spivak

Arkady Girshevich Aronov (Russian: Аркадий Гиршевич Аронов, Hebrew: ארקדי ארונוב; July 26, 1939 in Leningrad, Soviet Union – November 13, 1994 in Rehovot, Israel) was a Russian and Israeli theoretical condensed matter physicist, notable for his achievements in physics of semiconductors and in mesoscopic physics.

== Biography ==
Aronov was born in 1939 in Leningrad, currently Saint Petersburg, and in 1962 graduated from the Leningrad Electrotechnical Institute. He got his PhD degree from the Institute of Semiconductors of Russian Academy of Sciences in 1966 under supervision of Grigory Pikus. The title of his thesis was "Magnetic phenomena in crossed electric and magnetic fields". He stayed to work at the same institute as a researcher. In 1972, the Institute of Semiconductors was merged with into Ioffe Physical-Technical Institute. In 1974, Aronov moved to the Konstantinov Leningrad Nuclear Physics Institute, located in Gatchina. In 1977, he received there his Doktor nauk degree for the thesis "Behavior of superconductors and polarized conductors under non-equilibrium conditions". In December, 1990 Aronov was elected to be a Corresponding Member of Russian Academy of Sciences. In January 1991, he moved back to the Ioffe Institute to head the theoretical physics division, and, still holding this position, in May 1994 he joined the faculty of the Weizmann Institute of Science. In the 1990s, he visited University of Karlsruhe for extended periods of time, and he also became an Associate Member of the scientific staff of the International Centre for Theoretical Physics, Trieste. Arkady Aronov died in November 1994 in Rehovot as a result of a heart attack.

During his career, Arkady Aronov supervised a number of PhD theses including these of Evgeny Ivchenko, Boris Spivak, Boris Altshuler, Alexey Ioselevich, Aleksander Zyuzin, and Alexander Mirlin.

== Research activity ==
The fields in which Arkady Aronov contributed the most are

- optics of semiconductors;
- spin kinetics and spin-dependent transport phenomena in semiconductors and metals;
- non-equilibrium phenomena in superconductors;
- mesoscopic physics, including quantum kinetic theory of disordered electronic structures, disorder, interaction, and quantum coherence phenomena.

=== Spin relaxation ===
In 1975, together with late Gennady Bir and with Grigory Pikus, Aronov suggested a mechanism of spin relaxation in solids, which is currently known as the Bir–Aronov–Pikus mechanism and is considered to be one of three most important spin relaxation mechanisms, on par with the Dyakonov–Perel and Elliott–Yafet mechanisms.

=== Mesoscopic physics ===
Together with Boris Altshuler, a graduate student under his supervision, Aronov developed theory of electron-electron interaction in disordered conductors. In particular, he derived a Boltzmann-like equation which governs the kinetic behavior of electrons in conductors with weak disorder (weak localization regime), and discovered that electrical conductivity acquires a correction due to electron-electron interaction. This term is widely known as Altshuler–Aronov correction. In collaboration with Altshuler and Patrick A. Lee he applied this theory to explain the experimentally observed phenomenon of zero-bias anomaly - suppression of density of states by interactions at the Fermi surface.

In 1981, in collaboration with Boris Altshuler and David Khmelnitsky, he investigated decoherence of electrons in the weak localization regime due to electron-electron interaction, and discovered that two distinct time scales, decoherence (dephasing) time and relaxation time, exist in one and two dimensions. (In three dimensions, these time scales coincide).

In the same year, together with Boris Altshuler and Boris Spivak, Aronov suggested an experiment which by measuring an Aharonov–Bohm oscillations in a disordered conductor would reveal the weak localization effect by the existence of oscillations with the halved period as compared with Aharonov–Bohm oscillations in clean conductors. The experiment by Dmitry Sharvin and Yury Sharvin performed in the same year fully confirmed the predictions.

These advances were summarized by Altshuler and Aronov in a review article "Electron-Electron interaction in disordered conductors", which became a reference material in the field and by 2009 was cited over 1000 times.

In 1994 Aronov, in collaboration with Alexander Mirlin and Peter Wölfle, initiated studies of properties of electrons in random magnetic field which eventually opened the whole research field of electrons in random magnetic field, useful for understanding the quantum Hall effect.

== Honors ==
- Corresponding Member of Russian Academy of Sciences, 1990.
- Alexander von Humboldt Research Award, 1991.
- Hewlett Packard Europhysics Prize, 1993, shared with Boris Altshuler, David Khmelnitsky, Anatoly Larkin, and Boris Spivak, awarded for "Theoretical Work on Coherent Phenomena in disordered Conductors".
- Professorship of the Wilhelm and Else Heraeus Foundation, University of Karlsruhe.

Two symposia were held in memory of Arkady Aronov, one in Zikhron Ya'akov by Weizmann Institute of Science, where Aronov was a faculty member, in 1996, and another one in Karlsruhe Institute of Technology, where he spent extensive periods of time, in 2009.
