= Gregory Pikus =

Soviet theoretical physicist

Gregory Evgenievich (Ezekielevich) Pikus (May 7, 1923 – April 12, 1998) was a Soviet theoretical physicist whose contributions strongly influenced developing physics of semiconductors. Among his most fundamental contributions are development of the method of invariants in band theory of solids, the Bir-Aronov-Pikus mechanism of spin relaxation of electrons, prediction of the circular photogalvanic effect, and theory of weak localization in noncentrosymmetric structures. His three monographs reflect the focus points of the theory of semiconductors during the second half of the 20th century from transistors to band theory to properties to artificial nanostructures.

== Life and career ==
Pikus was born in Moscow but afterwards the family moved to Minsk (currently Belorussia) where he graduated from high school. After the graduation, he became a student in the physical-engineering department of Leningrad (currently St. Petersburg) Polytechnic University in the fall of 1940. Two events overshadowed young years of his life. During the Great Terror of the late 1930s Pikus lost his family, and after the Nazi invasion of USSR in the summer 1941 Pikus volunteered to the Army which resulted in long break in his education. He fought from Leningrad to Austria and received high military honors for his service. In 1947 Pikus resumed his education in Leningrad Polytechnic University. After the graduation in 1951 he was directed for work at an electronic factory in Novosibirsk. During the Thaw that followed Stalin's death, Abram Ioffe established in Leningrad the Institute for Semiconductors and Andrey I. Anselm, a head of the Theoretical Department of the institute, managed to bring his former student Pikus back to Leningrad. This allowed Pikus to start his research that lasted for four decades. He worked in the Institute for Semiconductors, and after its merging with the A. F. Ioffe Physical Technical Institute, in the Ioffe Institute to the rest of his life.

Pikus contributed to various areas of physics of semiconductors from optical spectroscopy to charge and spin transport. Distinguishing features of his style were symmetry approach to theoretical problems and close connection to experimental work. Pikus's deep feeling on the role of symmetry developed during his work with Bir on the effect of anisotropic deformations on energy spectrum and physical propertied of semiconductors, a controversial subject at that time. In the future, this approach guided prediction of the photogalvanic effect, developing of a nondissipative electric current in homogeneous gyrotropic crystals under their illumination by circularly polarized light. It was first discovered in bulk Te crystals with a tricky band structure and more recently became a powerful tool in physics of nanostructures. Active experimental research on optical orientation in semiconductors performed in the Ioffe Institute attracted Pikus's attention and resulted in the Bir-Aronov-Pikus mechanism of spin relaxation and prediction of optical alignment of excitons. In the late period of his life, Pikus concentrated on developing a consistent theory of the weak localization corrections to magnetoconductivity of spin-orbit coupled media.

Around Pikus grew a new generation of young theorists including such researchers as Gennady Bir, Arkady Aronov, and Eugene Ivchenko.

Pikus was awarded the Ioffe Prize of the Academy of Sciences (1987), USSR State Prize (1988), and the Hanle Prize of the Alexander von Humboldt Foundation (1993). The A. F. Ioffe Institute held in 2013 an all-Russia Seminar in commemoration of Pikus's 90th birthday.

== See also ==
- Anomalous photovoltaic effect
- Arkady Aronov
- Exciton
- Spin-orbit coupling
