= Dmitry Yurasov =

Russian historian and human rights activist

Dmitry Gennadievich Yurasov (Russian: Дмитрий Геннадиевич Юрасов; born 25 June 1964, in Moscow) is a Russian historian and human rights defender. Starting from age sixteen, he has been gathering information about victims of Soviet political repressions, those who were imprisoned, executed, died in detention, or went missing. He began his research in 1981 while working in the state archives as a paleographer, second rank. He secretly studied the files of those who had been killed, collecting eventually 123,000 cards from a register that, according to his estimate, amounted to 16 million files. While still only a student, he first publicly mentioned his results at a historical seminar in the central writers' building in Moscow on April 30, 1987. They caused quite a sensation, which resulted in his access to the archives being blocked, but also in many offers of help from volunteers all over the Soviet Union.

After graduating from the History Department, he has been working in various archives, including those of the USSR Supreme Court. This work provided him with more opportunities to expand his research. In February 1993, he was said to have as many as 430,000 files on people imprisoned or executed.

Dimitry Yurasov is mentioned in David Remnick's Lenin's Tomb book, where Remnick offers a hike to Yurasov.

According to Walter Laqueur, who mentions him in his 1990 book Stalin - The Glasnost Revelations, Yurasov gave TV interviews on the programs Vzglyad and with Sobesednik and Sovetskaya molodyozh on December 24, 1988. He was also published in Sovetskaya bibliografiya 5, pp. 61–67, in 1988.

== See also ==
- Human rights in Russia
