= Vera Yurasova =

Russian physicist

Vera Yurasova (4 August 1928 - 11 January 2023) was a Russian physicist who contributed to the study of the interactions between ion beams and solid surfaces, both in their experimental characteristics and their physical mechanisms.

== Life ==
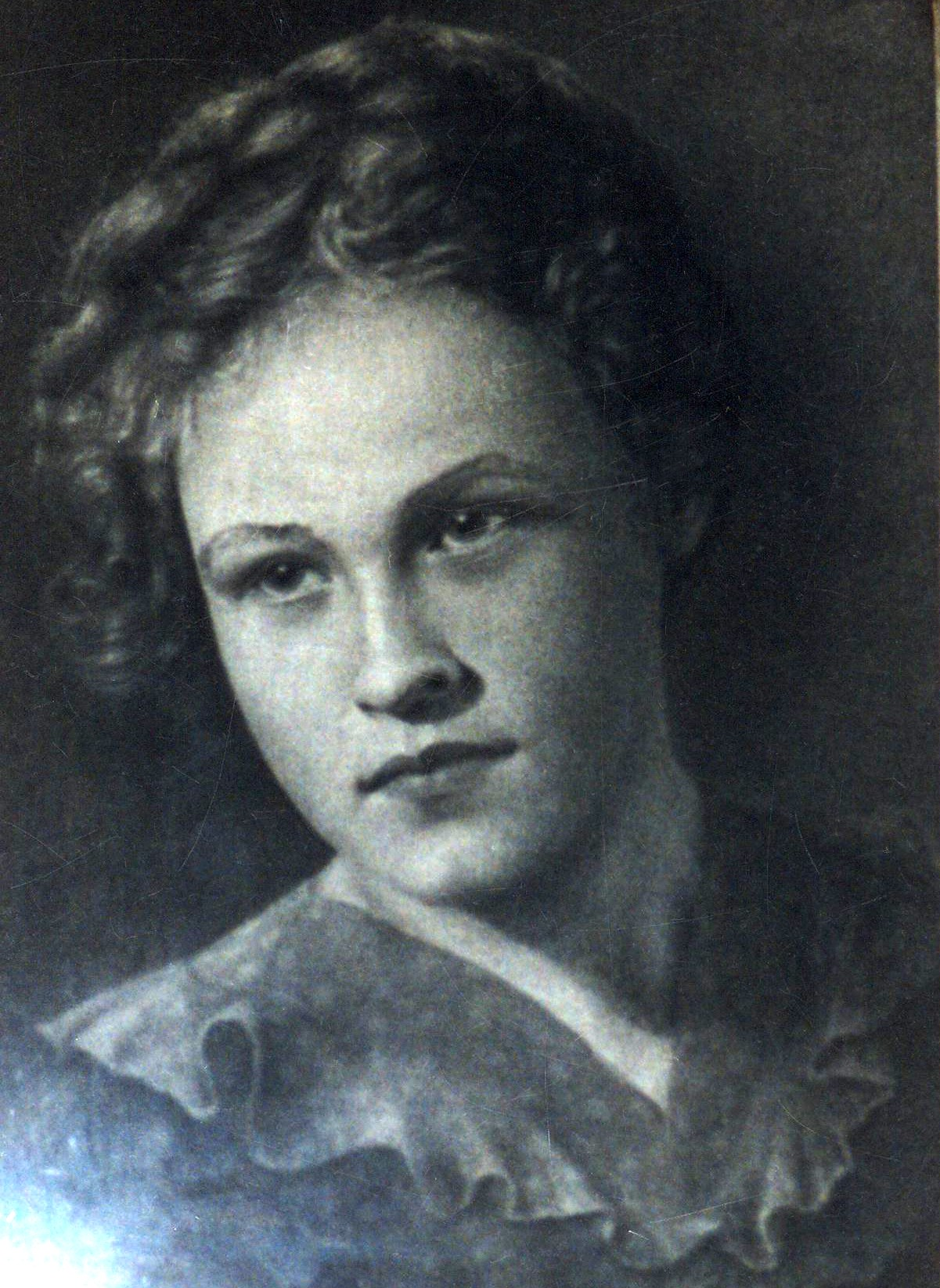
Portrait of Vera Yurasova by Anatoliy Gorshkov, charcoal on canvas, 1952

Vera Yurasova was born in Moscow on 4 August 1928. Her father, Evgeniy Yurasov, was the Head of the Department of Radio Communication in Aviation in the Zhukovsky Air Force Engineering Academy. Her husband, Anatoliy Gorshkov (1928–1997), was also a physicist and a Doctor of Science.

Vera Yurasova studied at the Physics Faculty of Moscow State University from 1946 to 1951. She did her diploma project – "Movement and focusing of particles in a trakhotron" – in the Institute of Automatic Telemechanics of Academy of Science of the USSR, under the supervision of Professor Dmitri Zyornov. After finishing her studies in 1951, she started work at Moscow University, at the department of electron optics, in the Faculty of Physics.

In 1958, she completed her PhD on "Processes under cathodic sputtering of metal mono- and poly-crystals", under supervision of Professor Grigoriy Spivak. In 1975, she became a Doctor of Science for her work on "Emission of atomic particles under ion bombardment of single crystals".

In the early days of her research, she regularly discussed her scientific results with key scientists, who were at the time working at the Physics Faculty of Moscow University: Aleksey Shubnikov, Sergey Vekshinskiy, Lev Artsimovich. Along with Spivak, she counted these as her teachers. Later, she had close scientific links with the theorist Oleg Firsov, with whom she also worked in the Russian Academy of Sciences Council for Plasma Physics.

Vera Yurasova was one of the founders of the scientific school of research on the interactions of atomic particles with solids, and her work was well known both in Russia and abroad. Key areas of her scientific research included electronics, radiation physics of solids, diagnostics of surfaces with ion beams, and computer simulation of ion interactions with surfaces.

=== Teaching at Moscow University ===
Vera taught at Moscow University for many years. Here, she developed and taught courses on "Electron-optic equipment", "Interaction of ions with the surface". She headed the Soviet (and later Russian) seminar on fundamental and applied problems in the interaction of ions with surfaces, which was a special seminar for PhD students studying sputtering and ion emissions. She supervised 30 successful PhD students, eight of whom went on to become Doctors of Science.

=== Scientific work ===
Among the highlights of her work, Vera

- Was the first to observe anisotropy of single-crystal sputtering at high energies of incident ions (in the range from one to tens of keV) and the anisotropy of ion scattering.
- Discovered a quantum effect in sputtering, showing that spin orientation influences the emission of secondary particles from ferromagnetic materials.
- Discovered oscillations in the energy spectrum of secondary excited ions, which point to quantum interference of various states of the ions and the target. This provided a new experimental method of establishing the electronic structure of the surface.
- Through experiments and computer simulation, was the first to research the specifics of binary-compound single crystal sputtering and find different anisotropy of the emission of the different components of the compound or alloy.
- Studied radiation stability of a number of compounds, used as hard coatings and as sources of light of increased brightness.
- Developed the methodology and created the first industrial installation for etching surface structure by ion bombardment.

Her scientific work was highly valued in scientific papers and books. See, for example, N.V. Pleshivdtsev "Cathodic Sputtering" (Atomizdat 1963) and R. Behrisch "Sputtering by Particle Bombardment, II" (Springer–Verlag, Berlin, Heidelberg, New York, 1983).

=== Scientific Committees ===
She played an active role on a number of scientific councils in the Academy of Science and the Ministry of Higher Education, and in the organising and programme committees of many international conferences. She was formerly a member of the International Bohmische Physical Society (from 1992), and the International Union for Vacuum Science, Technique and Applications — IUVSTA (from 1992), and a member of the editorial board of the international journal “Vacuum” (Elsevier).

Her hobbies included music, painting and photography.

=== Books ===
- V.E. Yurasova, G.V.Spivak, A.I.Krokhina, "Modern electron microscopy", M: NTO by A.S.Popov, 1965.
- M.D.Gabovich, M.I.Guseva, V.E.Yurasova, "Ion physics and technology". Kiev:I.F. 1990, 61 pp.
- V.E.Yurasova, "Interaction of ions with surfaces". М: PrimaB, 1999, 639pp.

=== Papers ===
Author of over 450 scientific works. These include:

- "Novel theory of cathode sputtering and micro-structure of sputtered surface of metal" (J. Techn. Phys. 1958, 28, 1966–1970); "Directed emission of particles from a copper single crystal sputtered by ions up to 50 keV" (JETP, 1959, 37, 966–971); "Anisotropy of the reflection of argon ions from a copper single crystal" (JETP, 1964, 47, 473–475); "Directional emission of charged particles from a single crystal under ion bombardment" (Phys. Stat. Sol., 1966, 17, k187-k190); "Change in sputtering of single-crystal nickel on going through the Curie point" (Letter to JETP, 1975, 21, 197–199); "Formation of cones during sputtering" (Rad. Eff., 1976, 27, 237–244); "Emission of secondary particles during ion bombardment of metals in the phase-transition region", Part 1: Sputtering (Vacuum, 1983, 33, 565–578), Part 2: Charged-particle and photon emission (Vacuum, 1986, 36, 435–458); "Quasi-resonance processes in the emission of excited secondary silicon ions" (NIMB,1988, 33, 547–550); "Auger-electron emission from ferromagnetic alloys" (Izvestiya AN, ser. fiz., 2006, 70, 889–893).
- Articles in the Great Soviet Encyclopaedia and the Encyclopaedic Dictionary of Physics. Editor of the Russian translation of a number of books on interactions of particles with solids. Has "author's certificate" for 10 inventions.

=== Prizes ===
- S.I. Vavilov prize for "Installation for etching of the structure of metals, semiconductors and dielectrics by ion bombardment" (1962).
- Prizes from the Soviet Ministry for Higher Education for best scientific works of the year (1982 and 1986).
- Silver medal from the Soviet Exhibition of National of Achievements (VDNH, now All-Russia Exhibition-Centre) for "Installation of ionic etching UIT-1" (1960). Medals from international exhibitions in Rio de Janeiro (1961) and London (1962) for the first industrial equipment for determining the structure of substance through ionic bombardment.
- Awarded, together with Gottfried Wehner, the prize of the U.S. Physical Electronics Industries Inc. "For pioneering work in sputtering", 1981 (to the "Mother of Sputtering" and to the "Father of Sputtering").
- Her biography is included in the biographical dictionary "Famous Russians" (Moscow, Astreya 2000), in "Who’s Who in Science and Engineering, 2001 and 2006" and in "Marquis Who’s Who in the World, 2008".
