= Technical Physics Letters =

Scientific journal on physics

- Discipline: Theoretical physics, applied physics
- Language: English

Publication details
- Former name: Soviet Technical Physics Letters (1975—1993)
- History: 1975—present
- Publisher: Springer, Pleiades Publishing
- Frequency: Monthly
- Impact factor: 0.9 (2024)

Standard abbreviations
- ISO 4: Tech. Phys. Lett.

Indexing
- CODEN: TPLEED
- ISSN: 1063-7850 (print); 1090-6533 (web)

Links
- Journal homepage; Online access; Online archive

Technical Physics Letters is a peer-reviewed scientific journal co-published monthly by Springer Science+Business Media and Pleiades Publishing. It covers rapid advances in applied, theoretical and experimental physics, with an emphasis on lasers and high-temperature superconductivity. Being a companion journal to Technical Physics, it was established under the name Soviet Technical Physics Letters in 1975 and featured English translations of the articles from the journal Pisma v Zhurnal Tekhnicheskoi Fiziki. Originally published by American Institute of Physics, it received its current name in 1993.

== Abstracting and indexing ==
The journal is abstracted and indexed in:

- Chemical Abstracts Service
- Current Contents/Physical, Chemical & Earth Sciences
- EBSCO databases
- Inspec
- ProQuest databases
- Science Citation Index Expanded
- Scopus

According to the Journal Citation Reports, the journal has a 2024 impact factor of 0.9.
