= Homopolar motor =

Direct current electric motor

A homopolar motor made with a battery cell and a coiled wire.

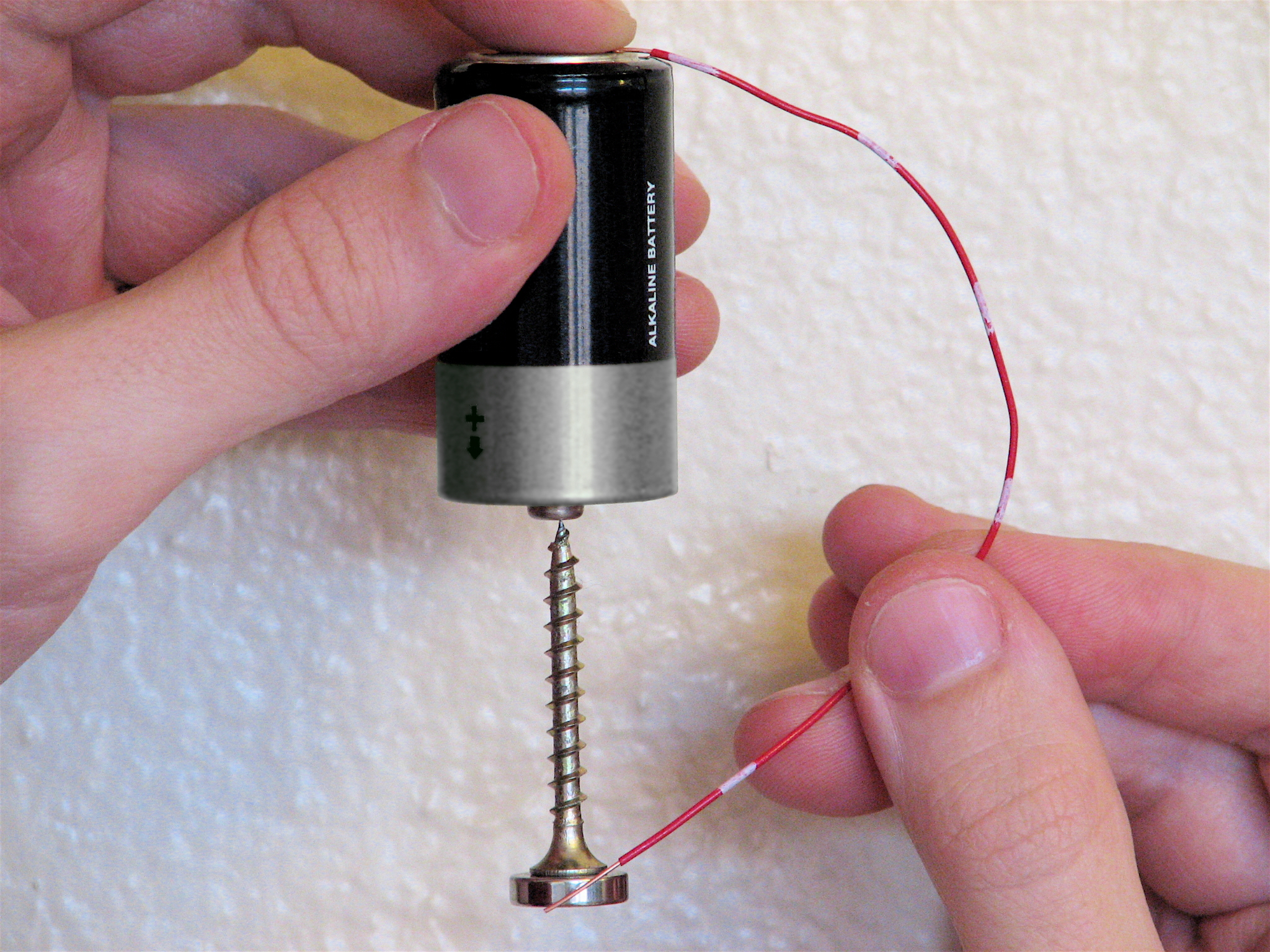
DIY simple homopolar motor made with a drywall screw, a battery cell, a wire, and a disk magnet. The magnet is on the screw head. The screw and magnet make contact with the bottom of the battery cell and are held together by the magnet's attraction. The screw and magnet spin, with the screw tip acting as a bearing.

A homopolar motor is a direct current electric motor with two magnetic poles, the conductors of which always cut unidirectional lines of magnetic flux by rotating a conductor around a fixed axis so that the conductor is perpendicular to a static magnetic field. The resulting force being continuous in one direction, the homopolar motor needs no commutator but still requires slip rings. The word homopolar indicates that the electrical polarity of the conductor and the magnetic field poles do not change (i.e., that it does not require commutation).

Running in reverse, the device is known as a homopolar generator and generates electricity from rotary motion.

== History ==
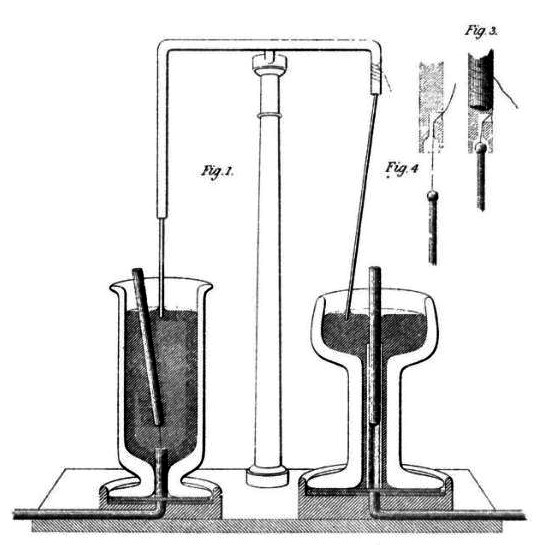
Electromagnetic rotation experiment of Faraday, ca. 1821

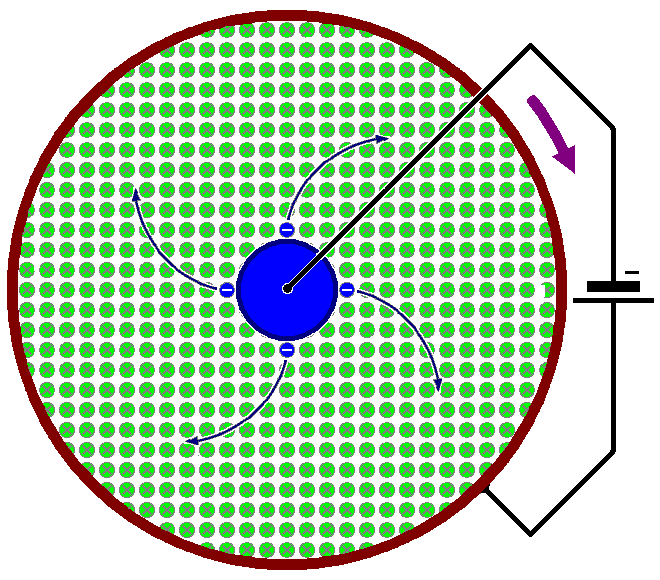
Working principle of a homopolar motor: due to movement of negative charges from center towards rim of the disk, a Lorentz force F_{L} is created which brings the entire disk into rotation.

The homopolar motor was the first electrical motor to be built. Its operation was demonstrated by Michael Faraday in 1821 at the Royal Institution in London.

In 1821, soon after the Danish physicist and chemist Hans Christian Ørsted discovered the phenomenon of electromagnetism, Humphry Davy and British scientist William Hyde Wollaston tried, but failed, to design an electric motor. Faraday, having been challenged by Davy as a joke, went on to build two devices to produce what he called "electromagnetic rotation". One of these, now known as the homopolar motor, caused a continuous circular motion that was engendered by the circular magnetic force around a wire that extended into a pool of mercury wherein was placed a magnet. The wire would then rotate around the magnet if supplied with current from a chemical battery. These experiments and inventions formed the foundation of modern electromagnetic technology. In his excitement, Faraday published results. This strained his mentor relationship with Davy, due to his mentor's jealousy of Faraday's achievement, and is the reason for Faraday’s assignment to other activities, which consequently prevented his involvement in electromagnetic research for several years.

B. G. Lamme described in 1913 a homopolar machine rated 2,000 kW, 260 V, 7,700 A and 1,200 rpm with 16 slip rings operating at a peripheral velocity of 67 m/s. A unipolar generator rated 1,125 kW, 7.5 V 150,000 A, 514 rpm built in 1934 was installed in a U.S. steel mill for pipe welding purposes.

Homopolar motors are high-torque and were proposed for use with the ship propellers. Experiments with the motors using superconductivity started in the 1960s and continue in the 21st century.

== Principle of operation ==
A homopolar motor is driven by the Lorentz force. A conductor with a current flowing through it when placed in a magnetic field which is perpendicular to the current feels a force in the direction perpendicular to both the magnetic field and the current. This force form a couple of forces with itself whose torque generates movement around the axis of rotation. Because the axis of rotation is parallel to the magnetic field, and the opposing magnetic fields do not change polarity, no commutation is required for the conductor to keep turning. This simplicity is most readily achieved with single turn designs, which makes homopolar motors unsuitable for most practical applications.

Like most electro-mechanical machines, a homopolar motor is reversible: if the conductor is turned mechanically, then it will operate as a homopolar generator, producing a direct current voltage between the two terminals of the conductor. The direct current produced is an effect of the homopolar nature of the design. Homopolar generators (HPGs) were extensively researched in the late 20th century as low voltage but very high current DC power supplies and have achieved some success powering experimental railguns.

== Construction ==
A homopolar motor is very easy to build. A permanent magnet is used to provide the external magnetic field in which the conductor will turn, and a battery causes a current to flow along a conducting wire. It is not necessary for the magnet to move, or even to be in contact with the rest of the motor; its sole purpose is to provide a magnetic field that will interact with the magnetic field induced by the current in the wire. One can attach the magnet to the battery and allow the conducting wire to rotate freely while closing the electric circuit by touching both the top of the battery and the magnet attached to the bottom of the battery. The wire and the battery may become hot if operated continuously.

== Gallery ==
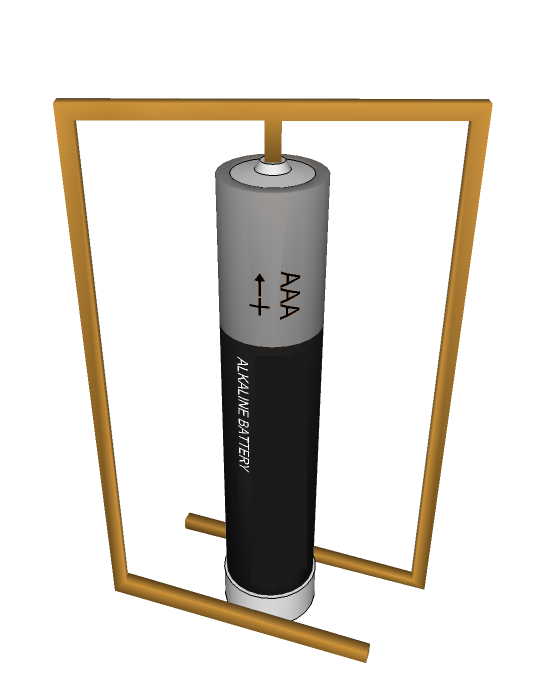
Homopolar motor 3D

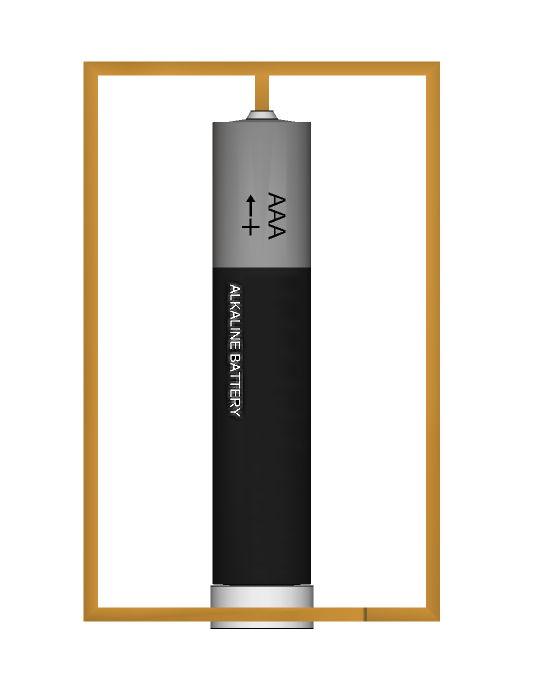
Homopolar motor 2D

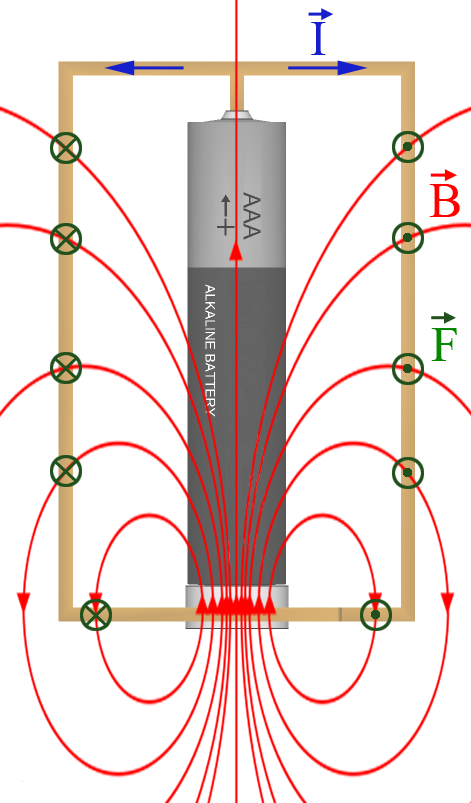
Current, magnetic field lines and Lorentz force on homopolar motor

Video

Video

== Examples ==
- Railgun
- Ball bearing motor
- Magnet

== See also ==
- Homopolar generators
- Barlow's wheel
- Lorentz Force
- Bipolar electric motor

== Sources ==
- Lorrain, Paul; Corson, Dale R. (1979). Electromagnetism. San Francisco: W.H. Freeman. ISBN 0-7167-0064-6.
- Parker, Earl Randall; Colombo, Umberto (1973). The Science of Materials Used in Advanced Technology. Wiley. ISBN 978-0-471-66350-8.
- Thome, R.J.; Creedon, W.; Reed, M.; Bowles, E.; Schaubel, K. (2002). Homopolar motor technology development. Vol. 1. IEEE. doi:10.1109/PESS.2002.1043229. ISBN 978-0-7803-7518-5.
