= Technical Physics =

Scientific journal on physics

- Discipline: Applied physics
- Language: English
- Edited by: Andrei G. Zabrodskii

Publication details
- Former name: Soviet Physics - Technical Physics (1956—1993)
- History: 1956—present
- Publisher: Springer, Pleiades Publishing
- Frequency: Monthly
- Impact factor: 0.7 (2024)

Standard abbreviations
- ISO 4: Tech. Phys.

Indexing
- CODEN: TEPHEX
- ISSN: 1063-7842 (print); 1090-6525 (web)

Links
- Journal homepage; Online access; Online archive

Technical Physics is a peer-reviewed scientific journal co-published monthly by Springer Science+Business Media and Pleiades Publishing. It covers developments as well as translated works in applied and theoretical physics, including atomic, molecular, and optical physics, plasma physics, solid state physics, electronics and photonics. The journal was established under the name Soviet Physics - Technical Physics in 1956 and featured English translations of the articles from the journal Zurnal Techniceskoj Fiziki. Originally published by American Institute of Physics, it received its current name in 1993. Its current editor-in-chief is Andrei G. Zabrodskii (Russian Academy of Sciences).

== Abstracting and indexing ==
The journal is abstracted and indexed in:

- Chemical Abstracts Service
- Current Contents/Physical, Chemical & Earth Sciences
- EBSCO databases
- Inspec
- ProQuest databases
- Science Citation Index Expanded
- Scopus

According to the Journal Citation Reports, the journal has a 2024 impact factor of 0.7.
