= Simplicity (disambiguation) =

Simplicity is the state or quality of being simple.

Simplicity may also refer to:

== Music ==
- Simplicity (The Bouncing Souls album), 2016
- Simplicity (Jaws album), 2016
- Simplicity (Joe Pass album) or the title song, 1967
- Simplicity (Tesla album), 2014
- Simplicity (Tim Curry album) or the title song, 1981
- Simplicity, an EP by Aril Brikha, 2003
- "Simplicity", a song by Gorillaz from Song Machine, Season One: Strange Timez, 2020

== Other uses ==
- Simplicity Manufacturing Company, a defunct American manufacturer of lawn and garden tractors
- Simplicity, a smart contract programming language
- Simplicity (photography), a photographic technique
- Simplicity Hill, in the Queen Maud Mountains, Antarctica
- USS Simplicity, a United States Navy patrol boat 1917–1918
- Simplicity, a variant of the solitaire card game Four Seasons

== See also ==
- Simpleton
- Simple (disambiguation)
- Simply (disambiguation)
