= Simple =

Simple or SIMPLE may refer to:

- Simplicity, the state or quality of being simple

== Arts and entertainment ==
- Simple (album), by Andy Yorke, 2008, and its title track

- "Simple" (Florida Georgia Line song), 2018
- "Simple", a song by Johnny Mathis from the 1984 album A Special Part of Me
- "Simple", a song by Collective Soul from the 1995 album Collective Soul
- "Simple", a song by Katy Perry from the 2005 soundtrack to The Sisterhood of the Traveling Pants
- "Simple", a song by Khalil from the 2017 album Prove It All
- "Simple", a song by Kreesha Turner from the 2008 album Passion
- "Simple", a song by Ty Dolla Sign from the 2017 album Beach House 3 deluxe version
- Simple (video game series), budget-priced console games

== Businesses and organisations ==
- Simple (bank), an American direct bank
- SIMPLE Group, a consulting conglomeration based in Gibraltar
- Simple Shoes, an American footwear brand
- Simple Skincare, a British brand of soap and skincare products

== People ==
- Simple Kapadia (1958–2009), Indian Bollywood actress and costume designer
- Simple Kaur, Indian weightlifter
- Peter Simple (columnist), pseudonym of Michael Wharton, Daily Telegraph columnist
- Simple E (Erica Williams), singer-songwriter
- Simple Kid (Ciaran McFeely), Irish-born musical artist
- s1mple (Oleksandr Kostyliev), professional video games player
- List of people known as "the Simple"

== Places ==
- Simplé, France
- Fort Simple, in Topeka, Kansas, U.S.

== Science, and technology and mathematics ==
- Simple (abstract algebra), an algebraic structure which cannot be divided
- Simple (botany), a leaf with only a single vein
- SIMPLE (dark matter experiment)
- SIMPLE (instant messaging protocol)
- SIMPLE (military communications protocol), defined by NATO
- Simple (pharmacology), a herbal remedy
- SiMPLE, a computer programming development system
- SIMPLE, a 4GL environment for the Prime Computer, when running INFORMATION
- SIMPLE algorithm, in computational fluid dynamics
- Simple function, a finite linear combination of indicator functions of measurable sets
- Simple machine, a mechanical device that changes the direction or magnitude of a force
- Simple polygon, one whose boundary does not intersect itself

== Other uses ==
- Simple (philosophy), a thing that has no proper parts
- Simple aspect or simple tenses, verb forms in English
- SIMPLE IRA (Savings Incentive Match Plan for Employees Individual Retirement Account), a retirement plan

== See also ==
- Simples (disambiguation)
- Simpl (disambiguation)
- Simpel
- Semple
- Simplicity (disambiguation)
- Simply (disambiguation)
- Simple Song (disambiguation)
