= Simpl =

Simpl or SIMPL may refer to:

- Simpl (Munich), a venue in Munich, Germany
- simpl., an abbreviation for 'simplification' or 'simplified'
- SIMPL, a Linux project
- Simpl (https://digital-strategy.ec.europa.eu/en/policies/simpl) is an open source, smart and secure middleware platform that supports data access and interoperability among European data spaces. It is currently (2024–07) under development by the European Union.

== See also ==
- Simpel
- Simple (disambiguation)
- Sympl
