= Night cycling =

Cycling when it is dark

Illuminated cycle path in VUDA Central Park, India

Night cycling, also called cycling in the dark or cycling after dark, is cycling after nightfall or in low light, whether for transport cycling, recreation or sport.

Cycling after dark differs from cycling in daylight, partly because bicycle lighting usually is used, typically in the form of a white front light and a red rear light. The front light helps the cyclist see the road ahead and should be designed so that it does not dazzle other road users. Front and rear lights also make the cyclist more visible to other cyclists and road users. Retroreflectors are also required on the bicycle, and wearing highly visible clothing or using additional marker lights can also be advisable.

Well-maintained cycleways and other types of separated cycling infrastructure with smooth, high-quality surfaces can be well-suited for safe night-time cycling, while shared infrastructure such as bike lanes or combined shared-use paths may pose higher risks of collisions with motorists or pedestrians than during the day due to reduced visibility. Concerns have been raised regarding the use of bicycle lanes at night.

Cycling in the dark is often associated with a higher risk of accidents, though this may be particularly true during times with heavy vehicular traffic, such as in the evening or early night. On the other hand, it has become popular to go for training rides at night or very early in the morning, so called night patrol or dawn patrol, because there is less traffic at these times.

Some long distance cycling races must be completed through the night due to their length. Examples include Paris–Brest–Paris in France or Styrkeprøven in Norway.

== History ==
Cycling in the dark has likely been practiced for as long as bicycles have existed. The first oil-powered bicycle lamps appeared in 1876. In 1888, the first electric bicycle lights were introduced, and by 1898 they began to be seen as a viable option. Dynamo-powered lights have long been popular for cycling in the dark, especially among touring cyclinsts covering long distances without a support crew. In recent years, LED lights with rechargeable lithium batteries have become an affordable solution that offers powerful and long-lasting illumination.

== Visibility ==
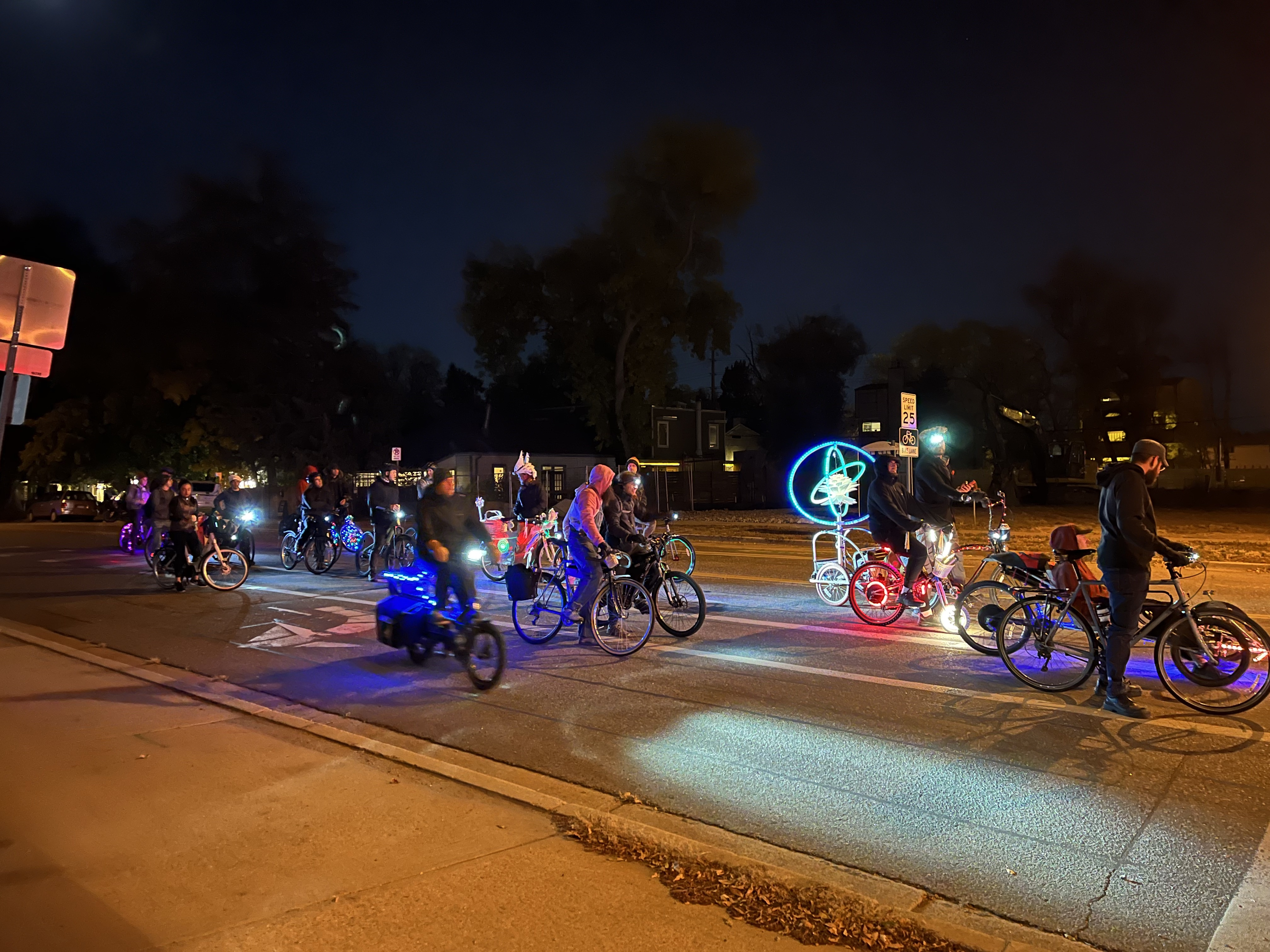
Cyclists with various decorative lights

At night, cyclists need lighting to see the road ahead. Headlights can also partly illuminate the cyclist so that he or she becomes more visible to other road users, but it is important that the headlights do not dazzle other road users. In Norway, there is a requirement that the cyclist's lighting must be visible from a distance of 300 metres. Lights and reflectors for bicycles are covered by the international standard ISO 6742.

Flashing bicycle lights are a controversial. While they can capture the attention of other road users, they can also be confusing. In some countries, such as Germany under StVZO regulations, flashing bicycle lights are prohibited. Some countries also mandate the use of reflectors on the sides of the tires.

Reflective material positioned to highlight body movements (so called biomotion) can be easier for other road users to recognize. Experiments have shown that cyclists wearing both a reflective vest and reflectors on their ankles and knees were detected at a significantly greater distance than cyclists who wore only a reflective vest or were dressed in black clothing. The same study indicated that using either a flashing or a steady bicycle light did not result in the cyclist being detected from a greater distance, suggesting that cyclists who use lights may develop an exaggerated sense of safety regarding their own visibility. A follow-up study revealed that cyclists overestimated the distance at which motorists could detect them at night, while underestimating the effectiveness of reflectors worn on the ankles and knees.

== Safety ==
Bicycle patrol at night

Cycling in the dark is associated with a higher frequency of injuries than cycling in daylight. A study by the Dutch SWOV Institute for Road Safety Research showed that the injury rate (that is, injuries relative to distance traveled) was higher in the dark late in the evening than in daylight, and significantly higher in the dark early in the morning. A controlled study in Denmark found that cyclists who used permanent running lights both during the day and at night reported 19% fewer injuries over the course of a year compared to the control group.

== Effect on cycling ==
Darkness leads to fewer people to choosing to cycle. A study in England showed a significantly sharper decline in cycling after dark in areas without street lighting, concluding that lighting can encourage cycling in the dark. The same study referenced research suggesting that poorly lit stretches deter cyclists, and that a smaller proportion of women (23%) than men (36%) felt safe when cycling in the dark.

== Recreation and sport ==
=== Group rides ===
The Dunwich Dynamo is a semi-organized cycling event that has taken place since 1992, covering a distance of approximately 180 km from London Fields in Hackney to Dunwich on the Suffolk coast. The event is scheduled for the Saturday evening closest to the full moon in July, partly for the sake of tradition and partly because cycling is easier under moonlight. Participation is free and requires no registration, and riders typically set off between 20:00 and 21:00 and arrive in Dunwich between 7:00 and 9:00 the following morning.

Midnight Ridazz is a monthly nighttime bike ride in Los Angeles that has at times has had over 1000 participants.

In 2024, a viral trend emerged in China in which university students cycled through the night from Zhengzhou to Kaifeng on shared bicycles to eat dumplings. After as many as 100000 participants reportedly took part on one evening in November, the police implemented traffic restrictions to put a stop to the rides.

Several Critical Mass events have also been organized after dark.

=== Endurance cycling ===
Long-distance cycling races often go through the night.

In 1891, Paris–Brest–Paris was held for the first time, and since 1931 it has been a non-competitive event. It takes place every four years, covers a distance of approximately 1200 kilometers, and has a 90-hour time limit. In a 2007 column in The Guardian, the ride was described as the most famous long-distance event taking place at night, and as "epic of sleep deprivation and saddle-soreness."

In ultra-distance races spanning several days, participants must manage their need for sleep. A study of 23 participants in the ultra-race Race Across France showed that those who slept more over the course of a 24-hour period finished higher in the rankings, while those who slept less were more tired and performed worse on cognitive tests.

In the UK, there is a scene for mountain bike races that take place at night, with some events not even starting until after sunset.

== See also ==
- Bicycle safety, measures, practices, strategies, equipment, and education aimed at reducing the risks associated with cycling
- Cold-weather biking, cycling during the cold season
- Cycling infrastructure, infrastructure for cyclists
- Light pollution, human-made light in the nighttime environment, caused by excessive or misdirected lighting
- Randonneuring, long-distance cycling
- Ultra-distance cycling, cycling over very long distances, typically covering more than 200 km in a single, continuous effort, or lasting at least six hours at a stretch
