= Simple Songs =

Simple Songs may refer to:

- Simple Songs (Steve Bell album), 2000
- Simple Songs (Jim O'Rourke album), 2015

== See also ==
- Simple Song (disambiguation)
