= Semple =

Semple is a surname of Scottish origin. Notable people with the name include:

== Arts and entertainment ==
- Dugald Semple (1884–1964), Scottish writer and simple living advocate
- George Semple (1700–1782), Irish architect
- Jack Semple (21st century), Canadian blues musician
- Keith Semple, Northern Ireland musician, member of British boyband One True Voice and American rock band 7th Heaven
- Lorenzo Semple Jr. (1923–2014), American screenwriter
- Pat Semple (1939–2021), British artist
- Stuart Semple (born 1980), contemporary English artist

== Government, military, and politics ==
- Bob Semple (1873–1955), member of the Cabinet of New Zealand
- Eugene Semple (1840–1908), thirteenth governor of Washington Territory
- Gordon Semple (1956–2016), British Metropolitan Police officer who was murdered
- James Semple (1798–1866), United States Senator from Illinois
- Letitia Semple (1821–1907), United States society patron and unofficial First Lady
- Robert Semple (Medal of Honor) (1887–1943), United States Navy officer
- Robert B. Semple (1806–1854), California newspaperman and politician

== Sport ==
- Billy Semple (born 1946), Scottish football player
- Carol Semple (born 1948), American golfer
- Frederick Semple (1872–1927), American golfer and tennis player
- Jock Semple (1903–1988), Scottish-American runner and sports official who physically tried to stop Kathrine Switzer from competing in the 1967 Boston Marathon
- Keith Semple (cricketer) (born 1970), Guyanese cricketer
- Ryan Semple (English footballer) (born 1985), English football player
- Ryan Semple (Northern Irish footballer) (born 1977), Northern Irish football player
- Tom Semple (1879–1943), Irish sportsperson
- Tony Semple (born 1970), American football player
- William Semple (footballer) (1861–1940), Scottish footballer

== Science and academia ==
- Calum Semple (born 1968), UK Clinician Scientist and Paediatrician
- David Semple (1856–1937), bacteriologist
- Ellen Churchill Semple (1863–1932), American geographer
- John C. Semple (born 1947), American botanist
- John Greenlees Semple, mathematician
- John W. Semple (born 1959), Canadian medical researcher
- Michael Semple, Irish expert on Afghanistan and Pakistan
- Sarah Semple (born 1973), British archaeologist

== Other fields ==
- Aimee Semple McPherson (1890–1944), Canadian-born evangelist whose first husband was Robert James Semple
- Etta Semple (1854–1914), American atheist and feminist
- Ian Semple (born 1928), member of the Universal House of Justice of the Bahá'í Faith
- Robert Semple (Canada) (1777–1816), Governor of the Hudson's Bay Company
- Robert B. Semple Jr. (born 1936), Pulitzer Prize-winning journalist
- Robert Sample (died 1719), occasionally spelled Semple, British pirate
- Sean Semple, South Africa-born Anglican bishop
- William F. Semple, American dentist who obtained an early patent for chewing gum

== Fictional characters ==
- Jake Semple, from the book Surviving the Applewhites
- Jesse B. Semple, featured in many stories by American writer Langston Hughes

== See also ==
- Sempill (disambiguation)
- Sample (disambiguation)
- Semple-Marzetta
- Simple (disambiguation)
