= Schmidt Original Nabendynamo =

- Company type: Cycle parts manufacturer
- Industry: Bicycle parts
- Founded: 1995
- Founder: Wilfried Schmidt
- Number of locations: Aixer Straße 44, Tübingen D-72072 Germany
- Area served: Worldwide
- Key people: Wilfried Schmidt
- Products: Hub dynamo
- Owner: Wilfried Schmidt
- Website: www.nabendynamo.de/english/index.html

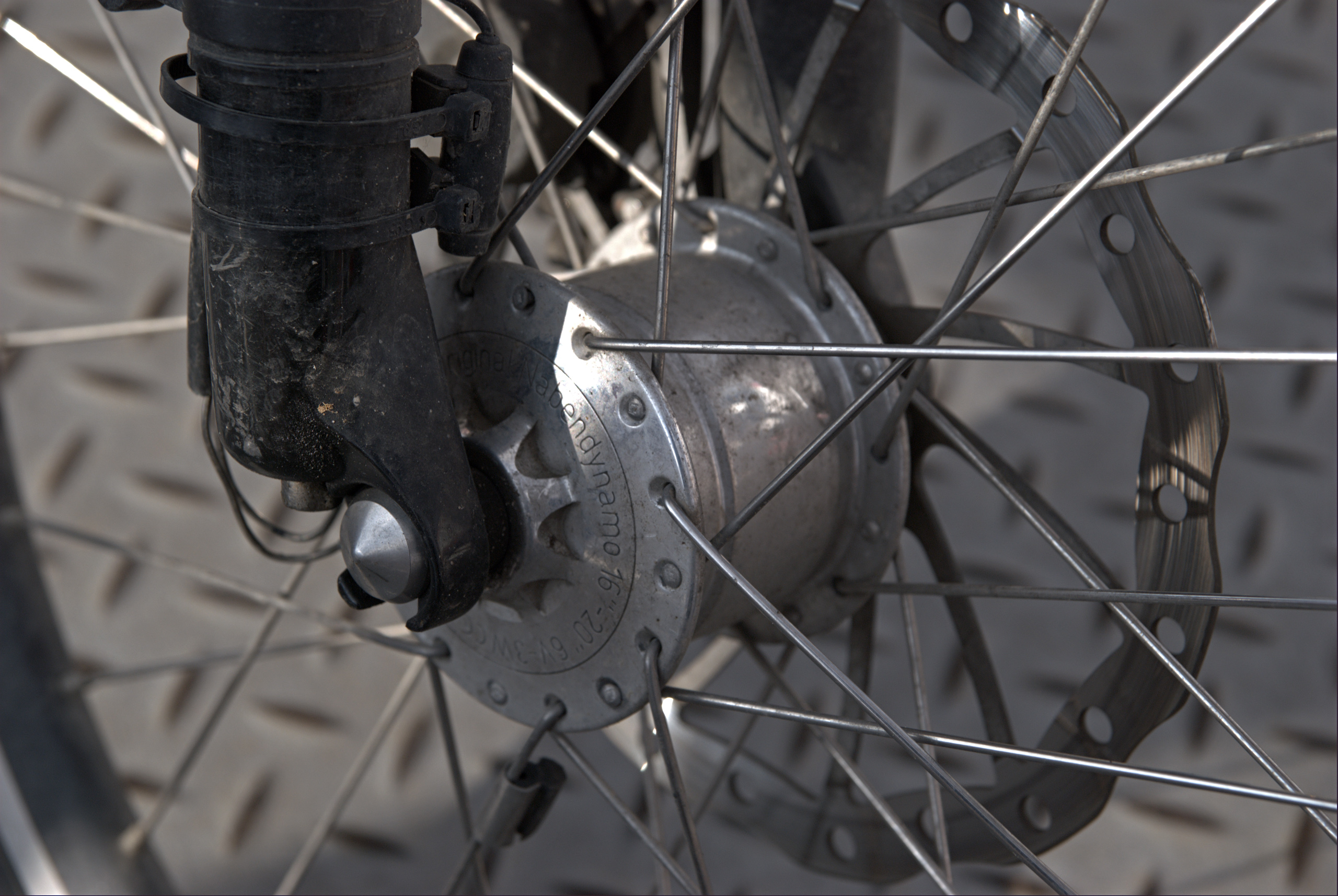
Schmidt hub dynamo disk brake

Schmidt Original Nabendynamo (SON) is a manufacturer of high-efficiency and low-drag bicycle hub power generators and other electric bicycle gear. The company is based in Tübingen, Southwest-Germany.
