= Bottle dynamo =

Electrical generator for bicycle lights

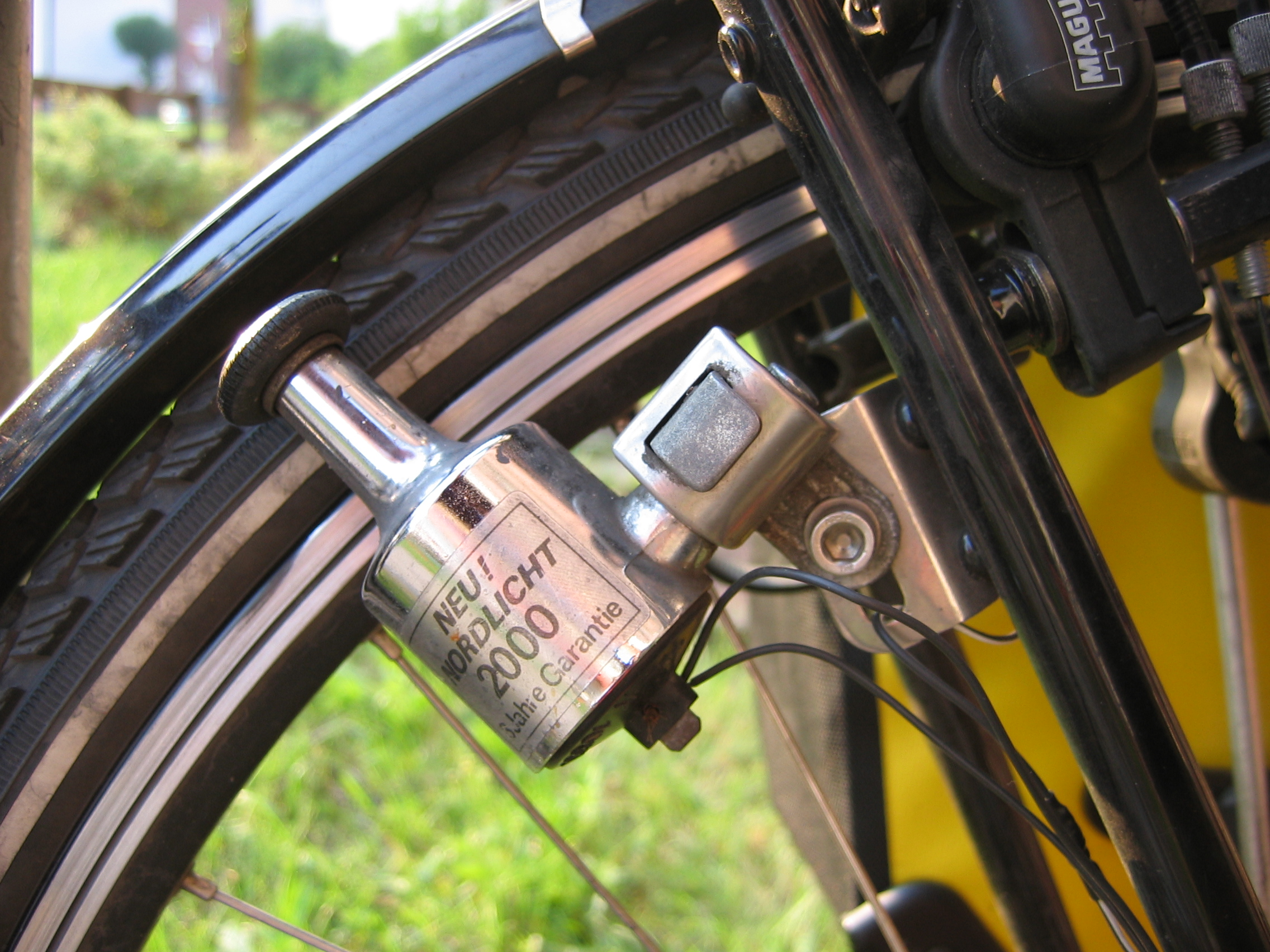
Bottle dynamo mounted on a bicycle

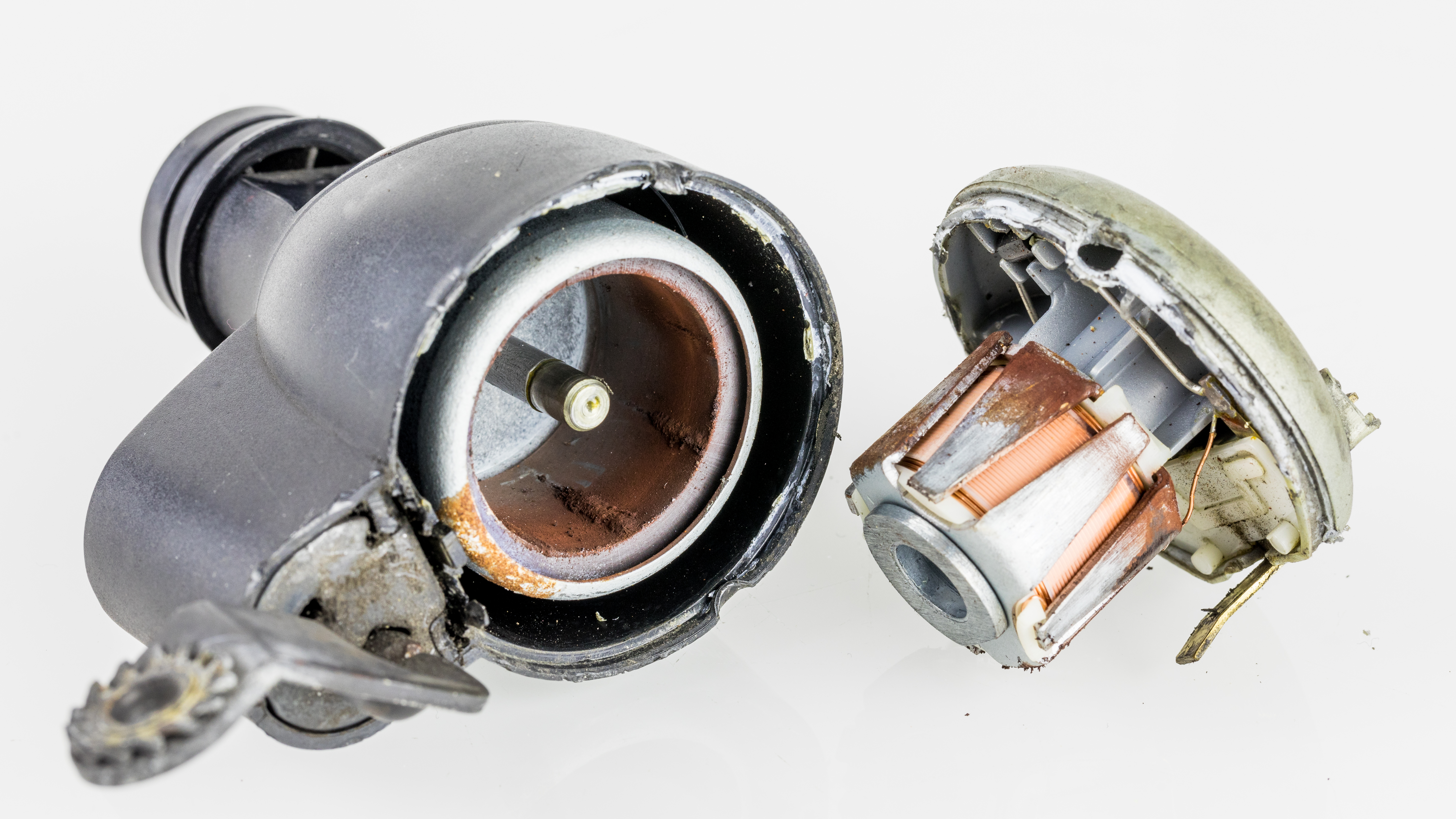
Dismantled bottle dynamo. Left: Housing with internal permanent magnet rotating together with the friction wheel. Right: Induction coil

A bottle dynamo or sidewall dynamo is a small electrical generator for bicycles employed to power a bicycle's lights. The traditional bottle dynamo (pictured) is not actually a dynamo at all (which creates DC power), but a low-power magneto that generates AC. Newer models can include a rectifier to create DC output to charge batteries for electronic devices including cellphones or GPS receivers.

Named after their resemblance to bottles, these generators are also called sidewall dynamos because they operate using a roller placed on the sidewall of a bicycle tire. When the bicycle is in motion and the dynamo roller is engaged, electricity is generated as the tire spins the roller.

Two other dynamo systems used on bicycles are hub dynamos and bottom bracket dynamos.

== Advantages over hub dynamos ==
No extra resistance when disengaged
When engaged, a dynamo requires the bicycle rider to exert more effort to maintain a given speed than would otherwise be necessary when the dynamo is not present or disengaged. Bottle dynamos can be completely disengaged when they are not in use, whereas a hub dynamo will always have added drag (though it may be so low as to be irrelevant or unnoticeable to the rider, and it is reduced significantly when lights are not being powered by the hub).
Easy retrofitting
A bottle dynamo may be more feasible than a hub dynamo to add to an existing bicycle, as it does not require a replacement or rebuilt wheel.
Price
A bottle dynamo is generally cheaper than a hub dynamo, but not always.

== Disadvantages over hub dynamos ==
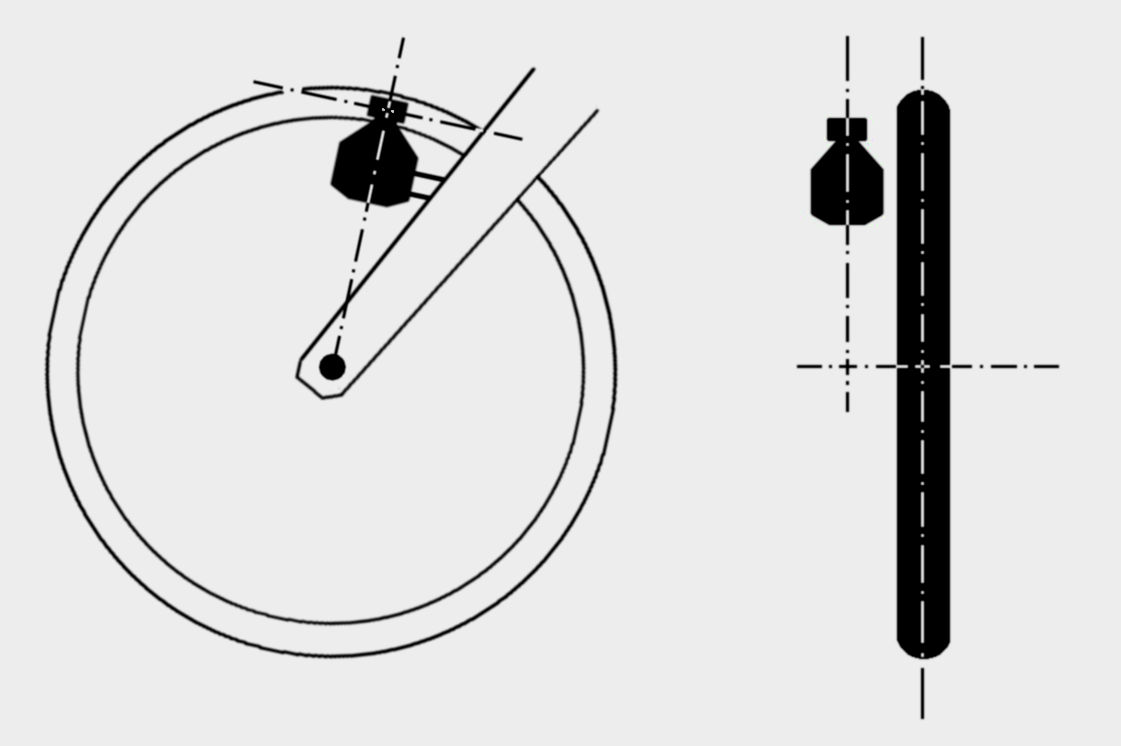
Positioning of a bottle dynamo

Slippage
In wet conditions, the roller on a bottle dynamo can slip against the surface of a tire, which interrupts or reduces the amount of electricity generated. This can cause the lights to go out completely or intermittently. Hub dynamos do not need traction and are sealed from the elements.
Increased resistance
Bottle dynamos typically create more drag than hub dynamos. However, when they are properly adjusted, the drag may be so low as to be trivial, and there is no resistance when the bottle dynamo is disengaged.
Tire wear
Because bottle dynamos rub against the sidewall of a tire to generate electricity, they cause added wear on the side of tire. Hub dynamos do not.
Noise
Bottle dynamos make an easily audible mechanical humming or whirring sound when engaged. Hub dynamos are silent.
Switching
Bottle dynamos must be physically repositioned to engage them, to turn on the lamps. Hub dynamos are switched on electrically. Hub dynamos can be engaged automatically by using electronic ambient light detection, providing zero-effort activation.
Positioning
Bottle dynamos must be carefully adjusted to touch the sidewall at correct angles, height and pressure. Bottle dynamos can be knocked out of position if the bike falls, or if the mounting screws are too loose. A badly positioned bottle dynamo will make more noise and drag, slip more easily, and can in worst case fall into the spokes. Some dynamo mounts have tabs to try to prevent the latter.

== See also ==
- Bicycle dynamo, electric generator fitted to a bicycle
- Hub dynamo, small generator built into the hub of a bicycle
- List of bicycle parts
- Night cycling, cycling when it is dark
- Third-brush dynamo, obsolete type of dynamo
