= Bicycle lighting =

Illumination devices attached to bicycles

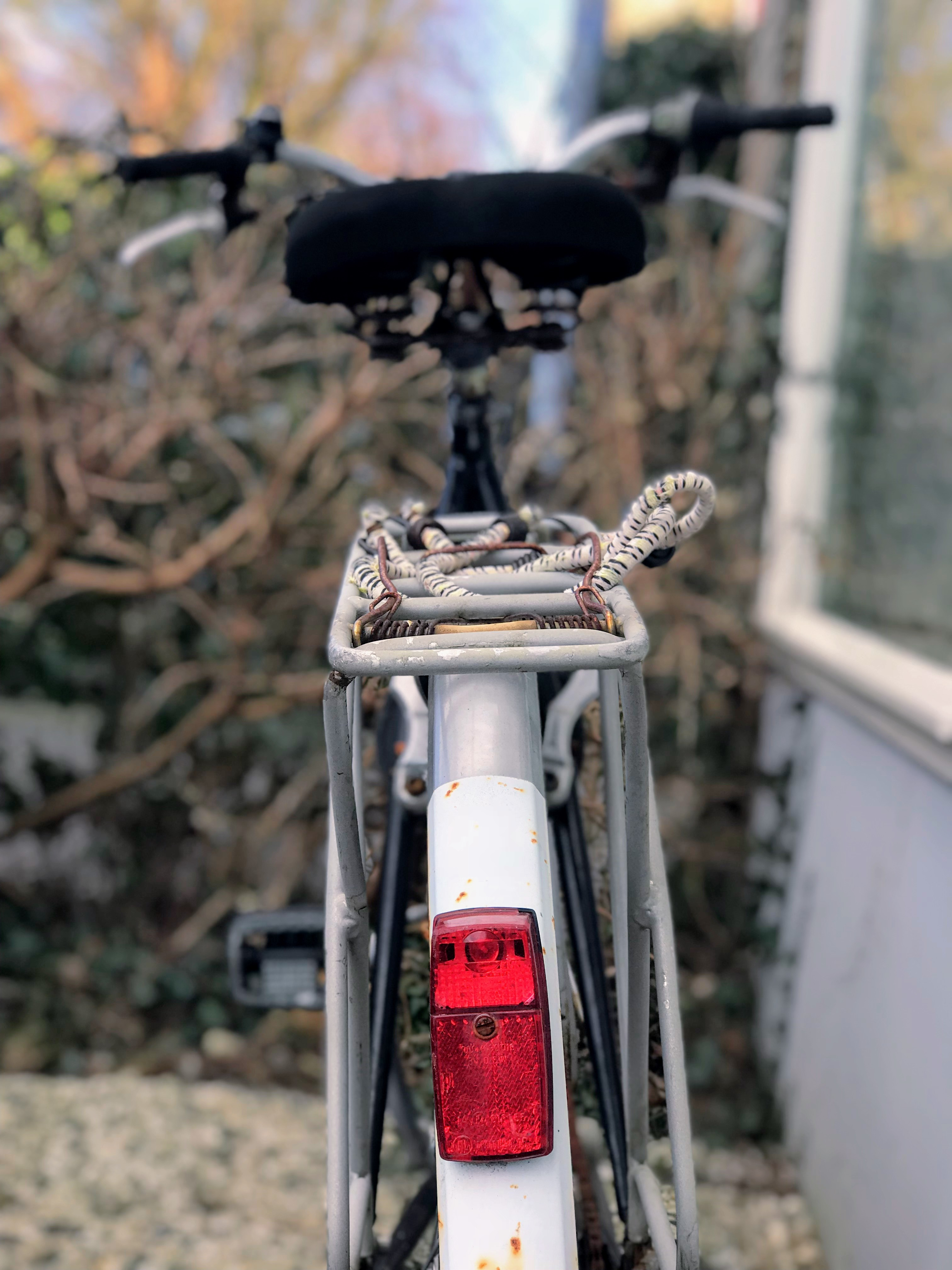
Red light on the back of a bicycle

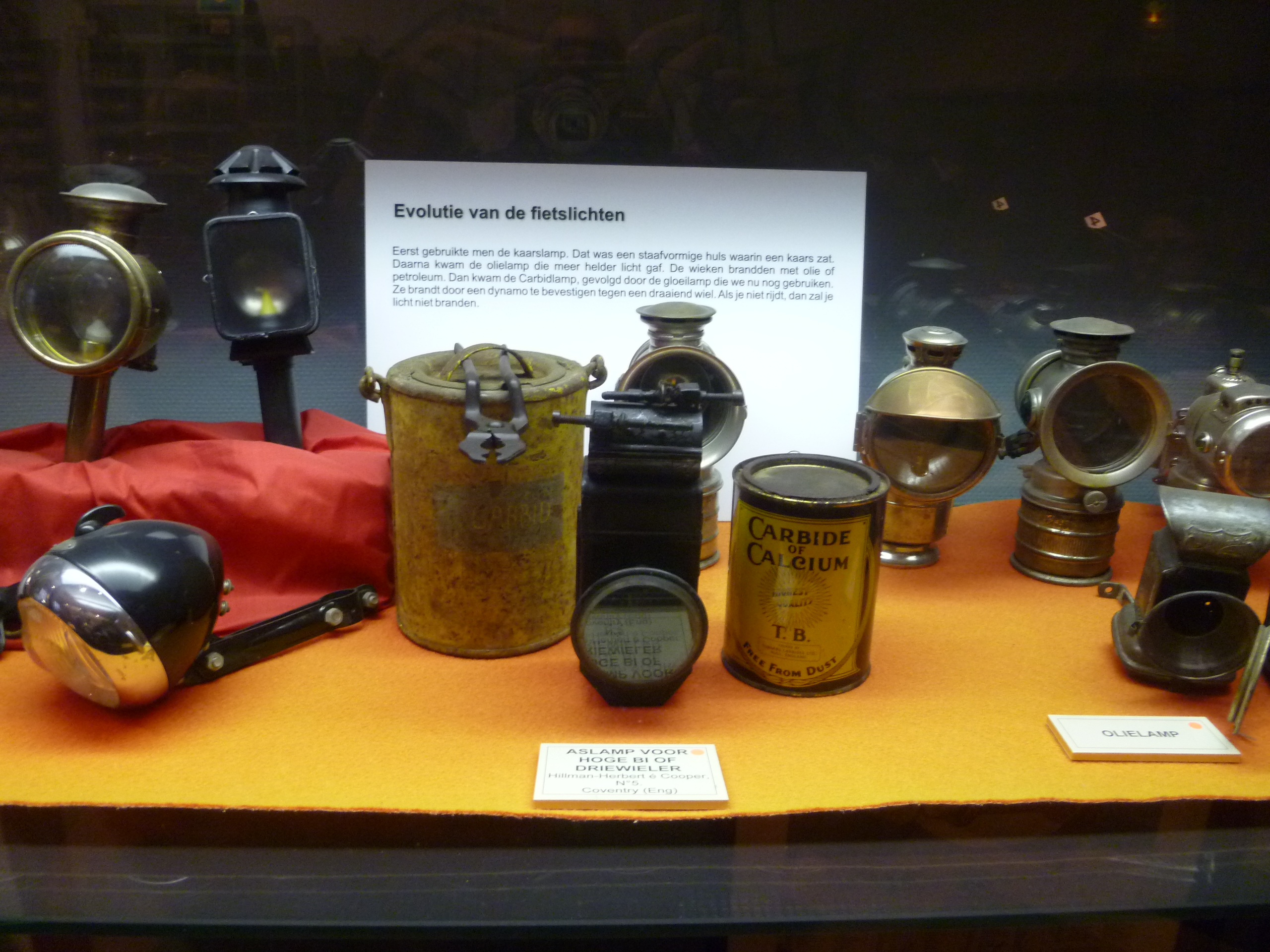
Early bicycle lighting: candle lamps, oil lamps and carbide lamps

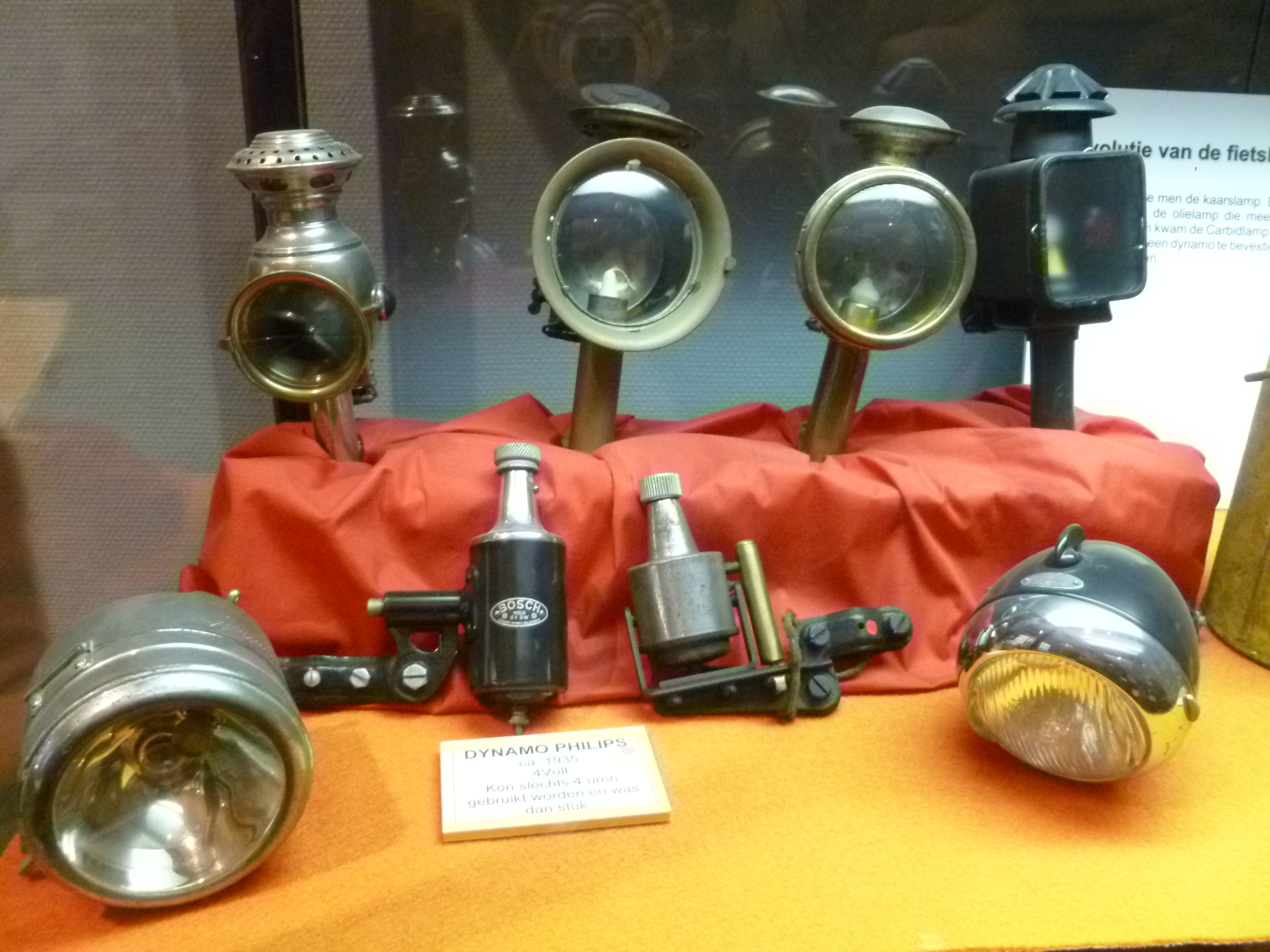
Early bicycle lamps and two early bottle dynamos (1935)

Bicycle lighting is illumination attached to bicycles whose purpose above all is, along with reflectors, to improve the visibility of the bicycle and its rider to other road users under circumstances of poor ambient illumination. A secondary purpose is to illuminate reflective materials such as cat's eyes and traffic signs. A third purpose may be to illuminate the roadway so that the rider can see the way ahead. Serving the latter purposes require much more luminous flux and thus more power.

Many jurisdictions require one or more bicycle lights to be fitted to bicycles ridden at night — generally a white light in the front and a red light at the back, like with other vehicles.

== History ==
=== Fire ===
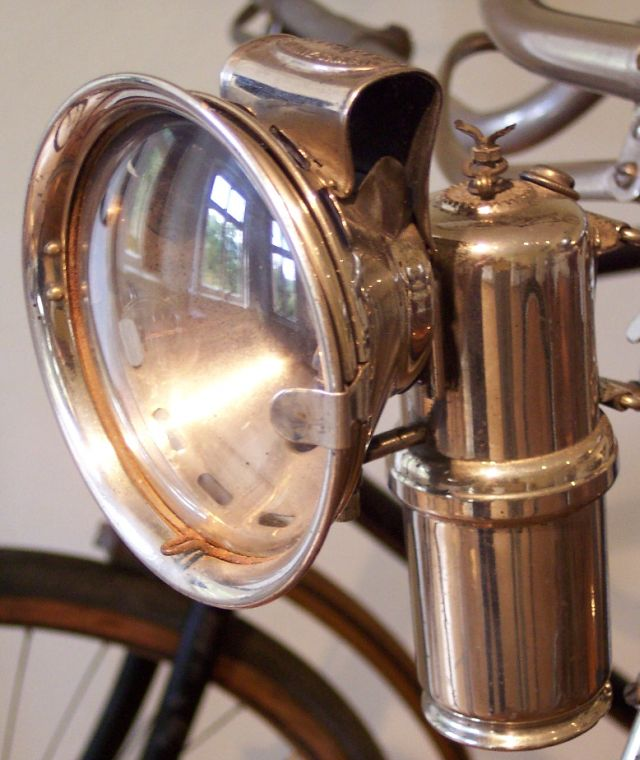
A carbide lamp

The earliest bicycle lamps were oil-fueled and started to be manufactured in 1876 for the Ordinary (High-Bicycle) and solid-tired tricycles. From 1896, acetylene gas lighting for bicycles started to be introduced and later in 1899, acetylene gas lamps for the motor-car became popular. Their carbide lamps were powered by acetylene gas, produced by combining calcium carbide with water. The light given was very bright, often called artificial daylight but the lamps required regular maintenance.

=== Electricity ===
From as early as 1888, electric-powered bicycle lamps were manufactured but did not become a viable proposition until 1898. They comprised an incandescent bulb and either a lead-acid battery or a dynamo. Lead-acid batteries were replaced by dry cells and later by alkaline batteries. Dynamos improved in efficiency and reliability, recently being incorporated into the wheel hub, for example. Moulding techniques for plastics also improved, allowing lens optics to be improved and cost reduced. Incandescent bulbs were replaced first by halogen lamps and later by light-emitting diodes (LEDs).

==== Halogen lights ====
Although these lights were originally designed for off-road use, where they were almost universal, rechargeable halogen lights became popular with commuter cyclists.

The lights used by most halogen rechargeable systems were cheap and bright, but fairly simple: they projected a cone of light (wide and narrow beam options were available) which is good for off-road use but not ideal for road use as it can dazzle oncoming road users. This is why halogen lights do not meet legal requirements in some jurisdictions.

Many systems used standard commercial prefocused optics, making a wide range of power and beam width combinations available. Most systems allowed simultaneous connection of different lamps - for example, a wide and a narrow beam for off-road riding, or a high- and a low-power beam for road riding.

==== HID lights ====
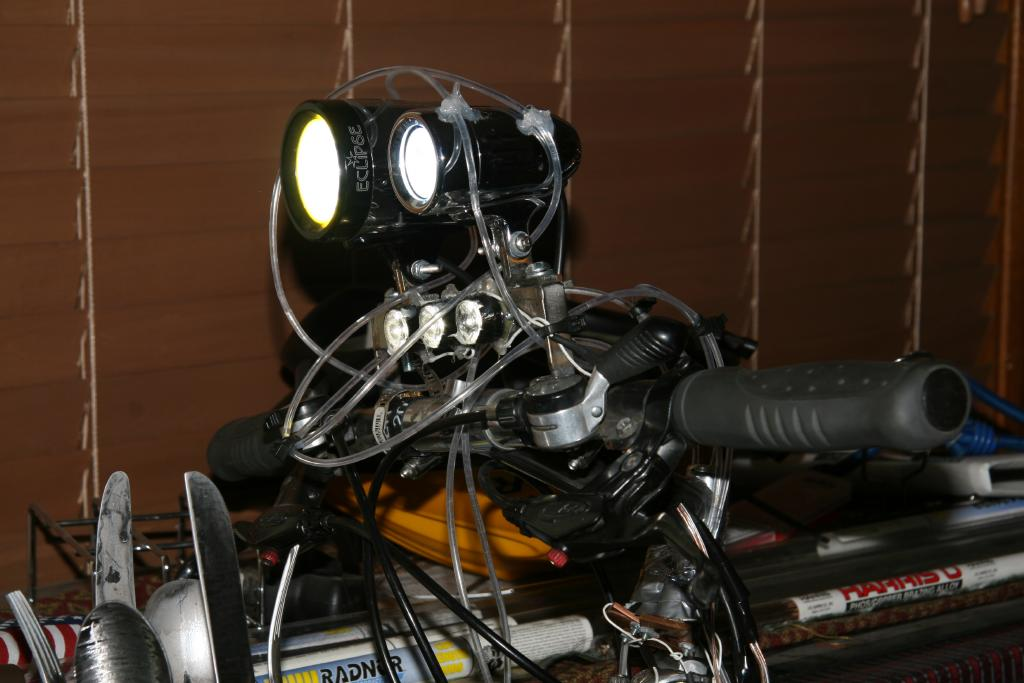
A home-made HID light assembly consisting of a 10 watt HID light (right) and a 30 watt HID light (left) as well as three 1 watt Luxeon high power LEDs

High-intensity discharge (HID) lights were a brighter/more efficient alternative to filament bulbs prior to the widespread adoption of LEDs. Like halogen systems, they were designed primarily for off-road use, having rotationally symmetrical beams which cast as much light up as down. HID lamps were susceptible to damage from repeated strikes, and in many cases did not relight immediately after shutting down. Likewise, should the battery level fall too low, the lamp would shut down rather than dimming. But the longer battery life than halogens tends to negate these problems, as many riders would simply switch the light on and leave it running throughout the ride.

==== Xenon strobes ====
Xenon strobes were an innovation in bicycle lighting; previously common in industrial applications. They were brighter than LEDs and sometimes used as rear lights.

== Lighting system ==
=== Electrical system ===
Batteries, either rechargeable or disposable, are often used to power electric bicycle lights. Where batteries are unwanted a magneto is used. In cycling circles the device is called a dynamo even though the device does not have a commutator. See section Dynamo systems for details.

==== Voltages ====
3 volt: Often supplied by 2 AA or C/D cell batteries.

6 volt: Sometimes 4 AA batteries or lead-acid batteries are used; also supplied from a bottle- or hub dynamo.

9 volt: Sometimes supplied by a PP3 battery

12 volt: Mostly supplied by sealed lead-acid batteries. The main advantage with this voltage is versatility of the electric system, such as the ability to charge a cell phone battery, though 5 volt USB is also used for that purpose too. It also allows electric air compressors to inflate tires. Some 12-volt dynamos are available too, though their watt rating is underpowered for medium to high watt applications.

=== Light sources ===
Virtually all bicycle lights on the market today, from the cheapest to the most expensive, are based on LEDs.

=== Legal requirements ===
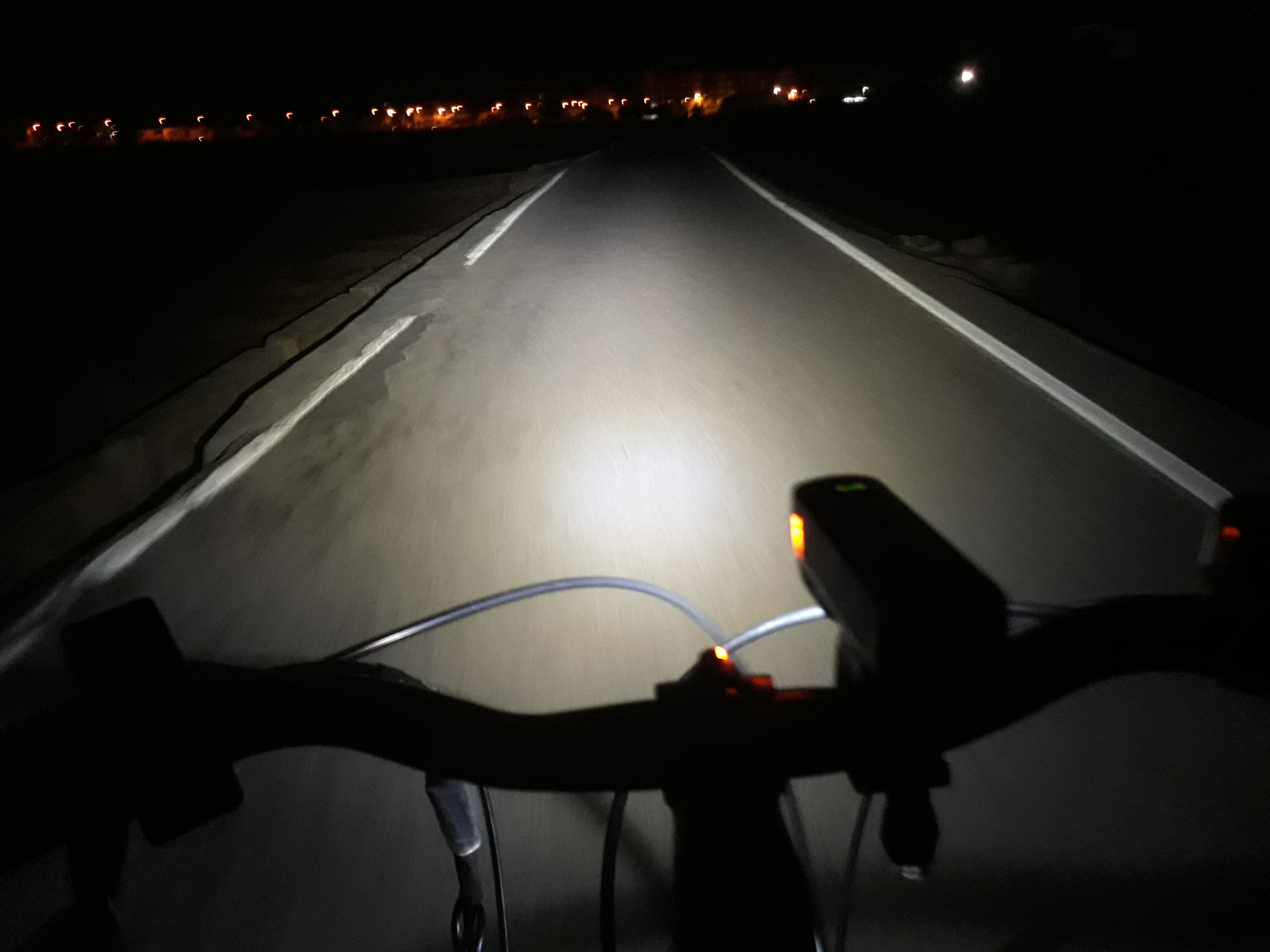
Powerful bike light correctly pointed downwards towards the road

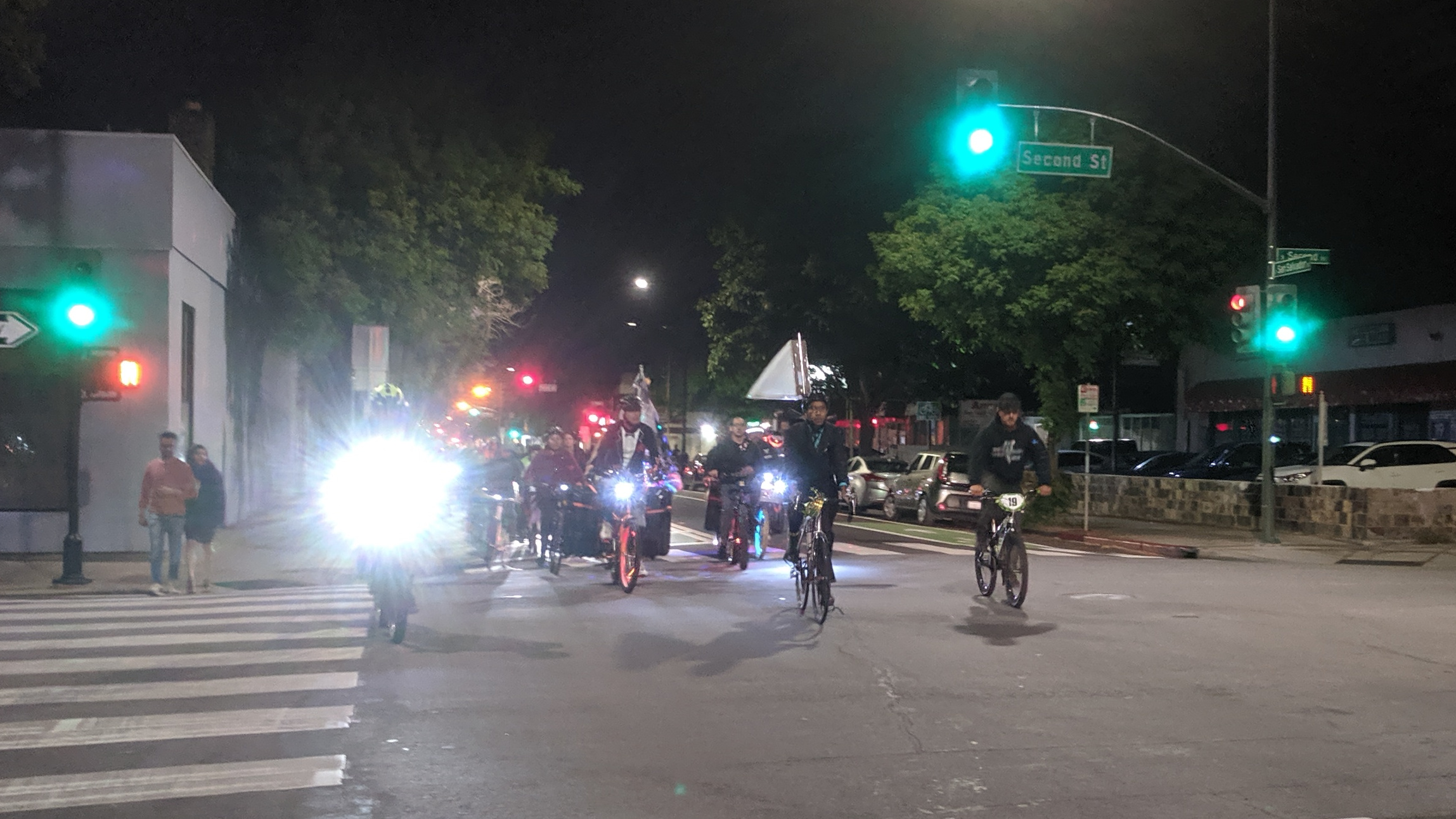
A misaligned bike light which dazzles oncoming traffic and therefore is illegal

Under the International Vienna Convention on Road Traffic (1968) of the United Nations, a bicycle is a vehicle. Article 44 of the Convention stipulates that: "Cycles without an engine in international traffic shall: (c) Be equipped with a red reflecting device at the rear and with devices such that the cycle can show a white or selective-yellow light to the front and a red light to the rear." In some countries, for example France, it may be an offence even to sell a bicycle not fitted with legally compliant lighting system. However, not all countries impose this requirement on cyclists.

Many jurisdictions require bicycles to be fitted with reflectors at the point of sale. In the United States this is regulated by the Consumer Product Safety Commission. CPSC compliant reflectors (also commonly fitted in other markets) have three retro-reflective panels positioned at 30° angles. The standard requires a forward-facing white reflector on the front of the bicycle, sideways-facing white reflectors on each wheel, a red reflector mounted on the rear, and yellow reflectors installed on the front and back of each pedal. Some interpret this as an endorsement of reflector-only night cycling.

Many jurisdictions require the use of a headlight and a rear light or reflector after dark. Most European countries and some US states require front and rear lights at night, while others allow reflectors only at the rear. Some jurisdictions impose requirements on light output and the size of lamp and reflector lenses; some require compliance with standards defined by third parties; some stipulate a minimum distance from which any lighting device should be visible. In some jurisdictions such as Germany and the Netherlands, flashing red tail lights are illegal, in others, they are allowed.

In the UK, the regulations governing bicycle lights are set out in the Road Vehicles Lighting Regulations 1989 and their subsequent amendments, summarized in the Highway Code. The regulations require a white front light, a red rear light, a red rear reflector, and amber/yellow pedal reflectors on the front and rear of both pedals. Reflectors must conform to BS 6102/2 or an equivalent European standard. The situation for lights is more complicated:

- a light with a steady mode is considered approved only if it conforms to BS 6102/3 or an equivalent European standard;
- a light without a steady mode is considered approved only if it flashes at a constant rate of between 60 and 240 flashes per minute and has a luminous intensity of at least 4 candela;

The majority of LED lights available are not approved for UK use since they have steady modes that do not conform to BS 6102/3. It is, however, legal to fit additional lights providing that they are of the correct colour, they do not dazzle other road users and that if they flash, they do so at a constant rate of between 60 and 240 flashes per minute.

National cyclists' organisations such as LAB (US) or CTC (UK) are a source of lighting information.

=== Safety ===
The use of lights for night riding is generally recommended or required by authorities as a basic safety precaution, even in a well-lit urban context. show a correlation between collisions and failure to use lights even during daytime.

In countries where bicycles are used widely for commuting and short trips, such as the Netherlands and Scandinavia, bicycle head- and tail lighting regulation is strictly enforced by the authorities. However, a study from 2013 shows that different lighting regulations seem to have little influence on bicycle accident rates, and points out a lack of studies into the safety benefits of bicycle lighting.

== Front lighting ==
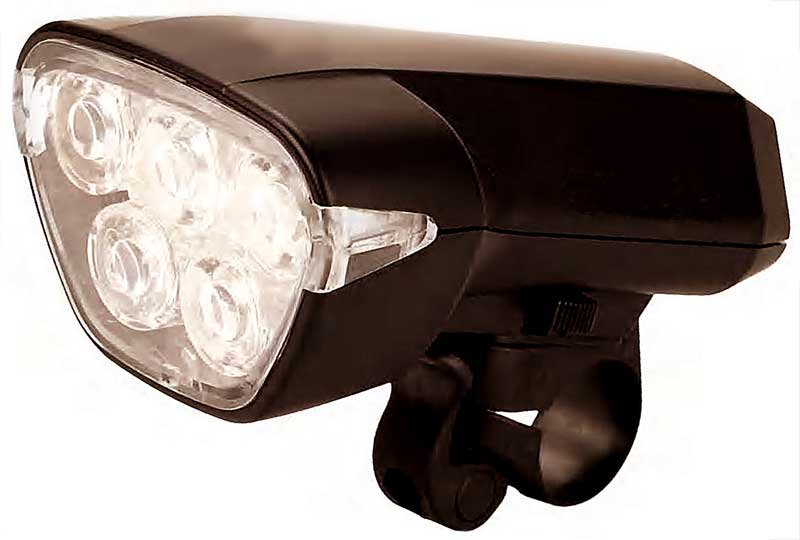
LED headlight Cateye EL-300

White LEDs are available with output ranging from a few lumens to high-powered units producing about as much light as an automotive headlamp, suitable for high speed use on unlit trails.

LED systems often include an option to dim the LEDs, or to provide a flashing light.

Low-cost battery lights can be a good choice for occasional use, and usually meet legislative requirements. However, regular bicycle commuters would probably find it cost-effective to use rechargeable cells. Some headlamps use lithium-ion rechargeable battery packs, which may be recharged from a USB port.

=== Flashlights ===
Flashlights, although not specifically designed for bicycle use, are a viable alternative. They can be fastened to the bicycle handlebars with various mounting devices such as a lock-block. The round light pattern of a general purpose flashlight is inferior to the beam of a bicycle headlamp properly shaped to illuminate the roadway and not provide excess glare to oncoming traffic.

== Rear lighting ==
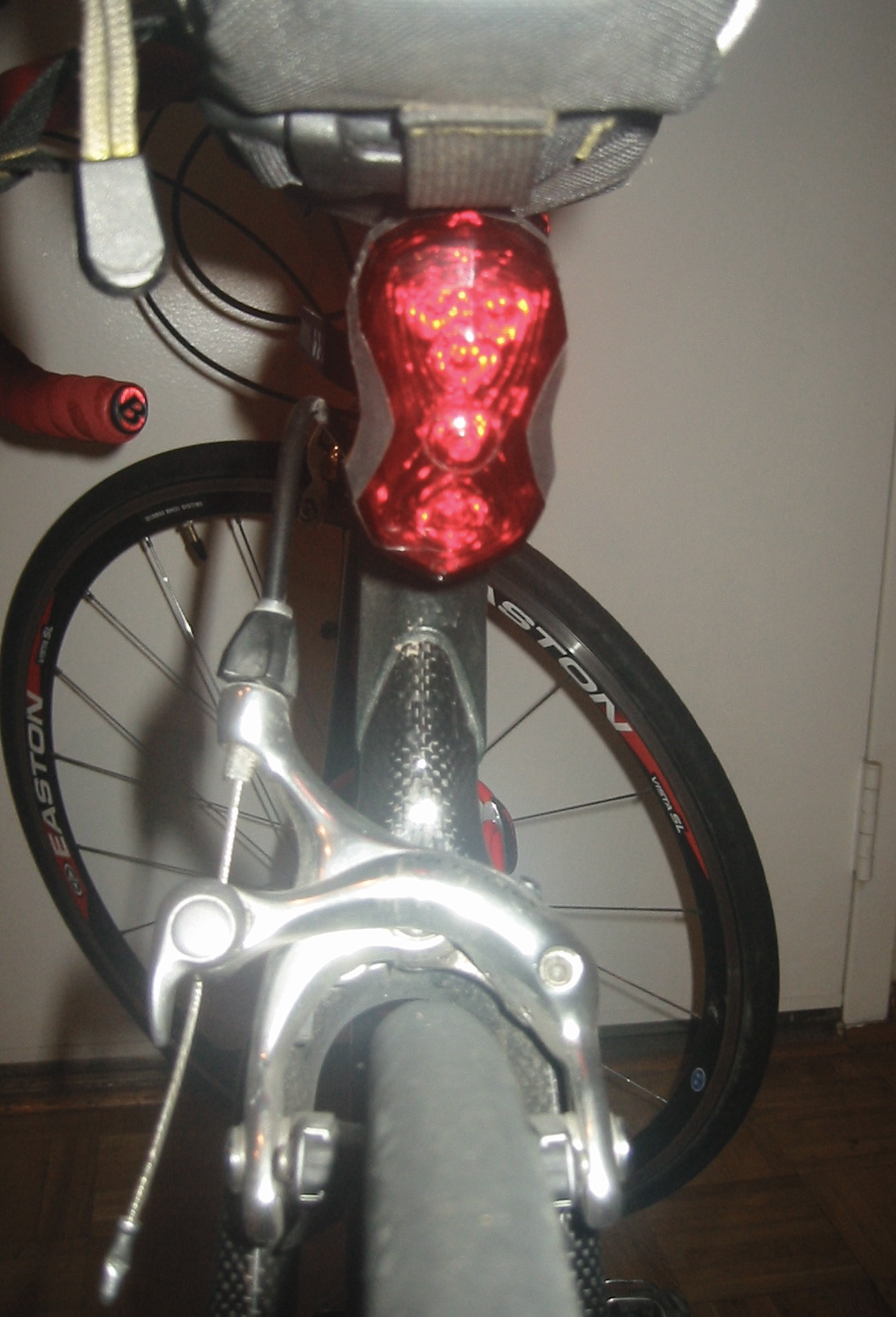
Rear LED light mounted on the seatpost of a road bicycle

Most LED lights will work in either flashing or steady modes. Some LED lights have multiple banks of LEDs allowing both flashing and steady light at once. This can also be achieved by having one flashing light and one steady.

In many countries, LED flashers are the norm for rear lights. In others such as Germany and the Netherlands flashing lights are forbidden by law. In the UK flashing LEDs (front and rear) are legal from October 2005, provided that the lights conform to the requirements of the current Road Vehicles Lighting regulations. Many vendors claim EU compliance, however, this provides no consistent safety or legal value across the Union.

The most common power source for rear LEDs is a set of alkaline cells and rechargeable cells. In both cases the battery tends to fail quickly when it goes; it is widely considered a good practice to have two rear lights in case a battery fails en route.

Low power lights are mainly for being seen, or as an emergency backup, and are the dominant choice for rear lights. Rear marker LED lamps may be operated on disposable coin-sized cells.

Some high-end rear lights incorporate turn signal and brake light functions, switched via a handlebar control via radio frequencies.

== Power supplies ==
=== Batteries ===
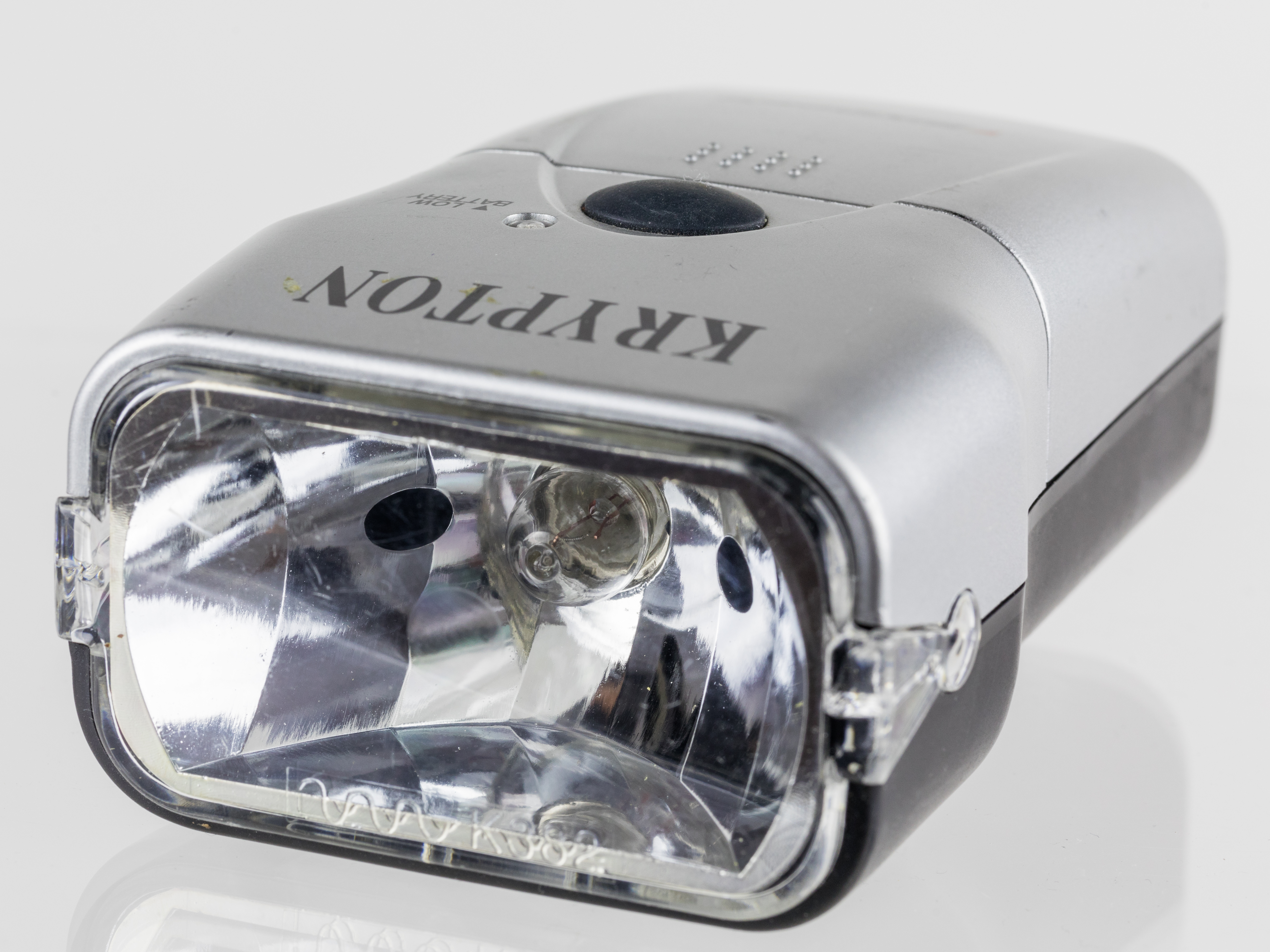

The introduction of the Low self-discharge NiMH battery (LSD-NiMH) in 2005 made rechargeable AA and AAA sized batteries more viable for powering LED bicycle lights. Previously, the self-discharge effect of NiCAD and NiMH batteries caused the battery to run down over a period of weeks or a few months, even when not in use. This was particularly a problem for low powered LED lights, and for users who only used their bicycle lights occasionally. The LSD-NiMH battery greatly reduced the self-discharge effect, allowing the battery to keep its charge for a year or more.

For higher-powered lights, an external battery pack of 12V VRLA battery is often required. These battery packs usually strap to the top tube of the frame, or come in the shape that fits in a water bottle cage, or can be placed in a basket. A cable connects the battery pack to the light. Another advantage with battery power (especially with 12 volt) is the ability to power other components outside of lighting, as well as all from one battery (as long as they run safe on 12 volts) though wire spaghetti from splicing can be a setback depending on how complicated the electric system is.

Alternatively, Li-ion and LiPo batteries have been becoming more popular with bicyclists due to their higher capacity and lighter weight compared with conventional batteries. More specifically, the 18650 battery, which has been popular with electric car manufacturers (for the same reasons) and are commonly found in laptops and flashlights.

=== Dynamo systems ===
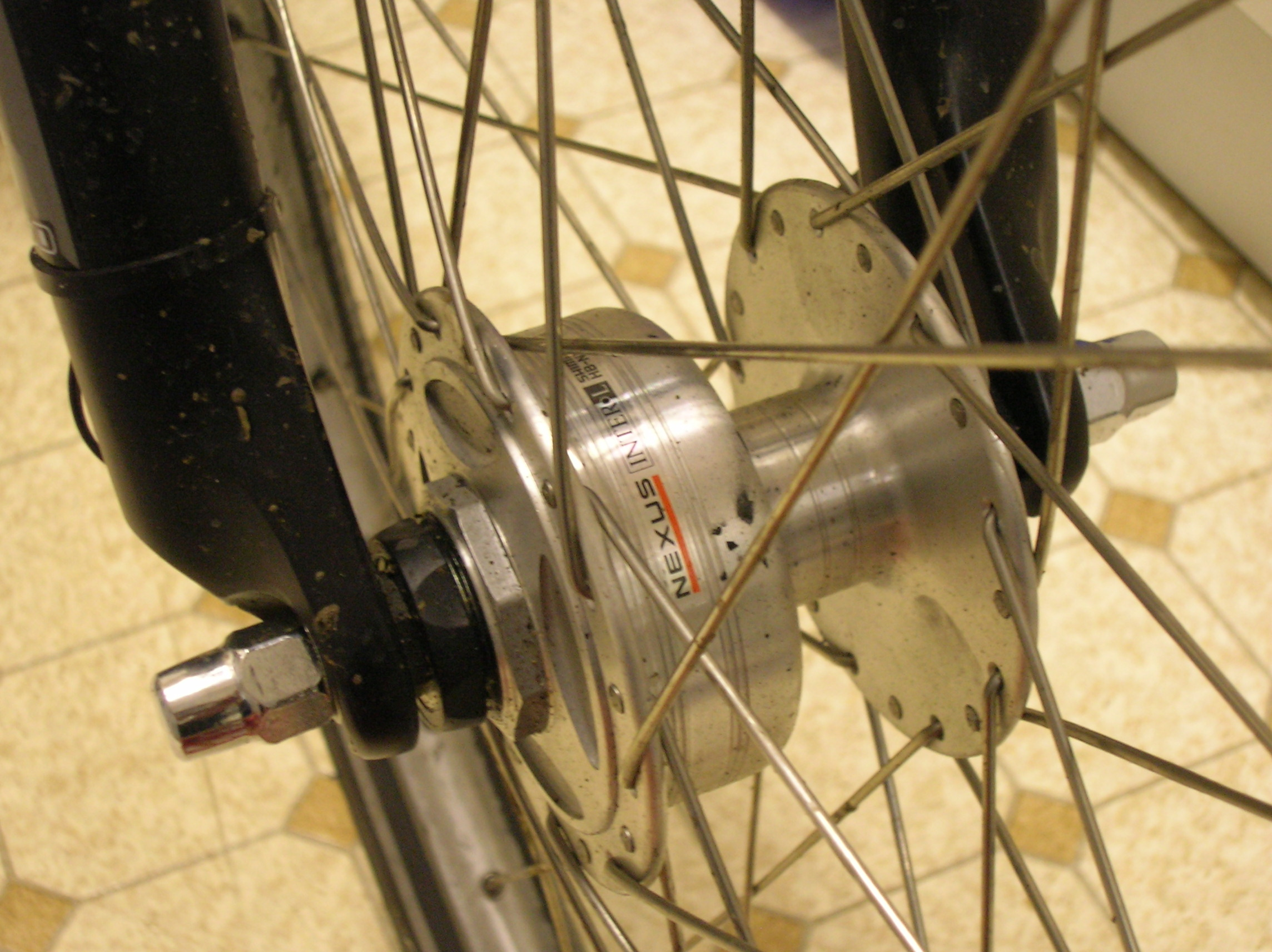
Shimano Nexus hub dynamo

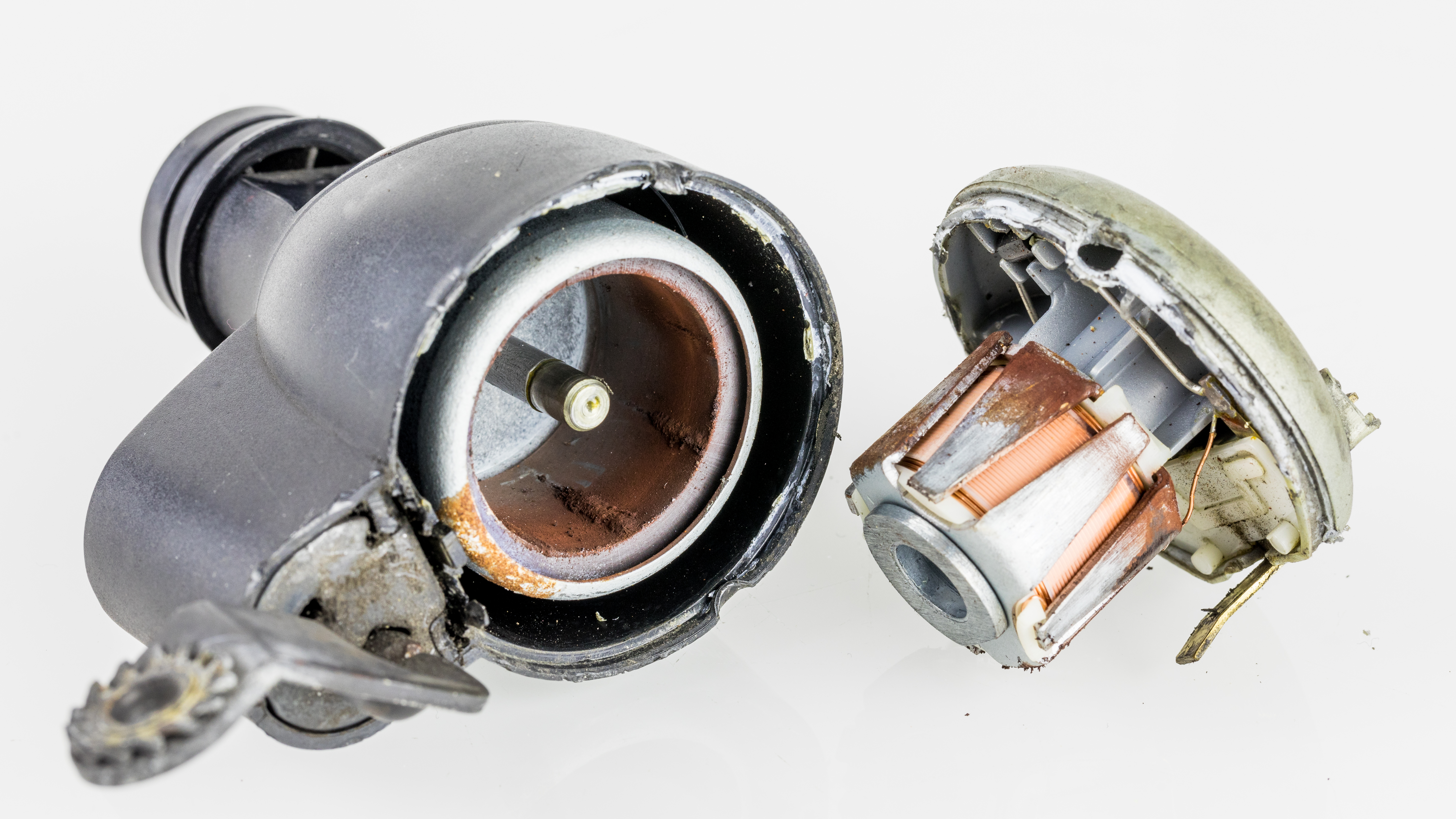
Dismantled bottle dynamo. Left: Housing with internal permanent magnet rotating through the friction wheel. Right: Induction coil

Dynamo systems require no batteries and may be permanently fitted to the bike.

Bicycle dynamos are actually magnetos and produce alternating current.

==== Types ====
There are three main types:

- Hub dynamos are built into the front or rear wheel hub. These are generally the most reliable and most efficient of the three types.
- Bottle dynamos (or sidewall dynamos) attach to the seatstay or fork and are rotated by a small wheel in contact with the tire sidewall. These are easier to retrofit than hub dynamos, but are prone to slipping, especially in wet conditions.
- Bottom-bracket dynamos are attached between the chainstays behind the bottom bracket and are powered by a roller against the center of the tire. These do not wear the tire sidewall and do not slip, but are exposed to dirt and spray from the road.

Other types of dynamos exist, but are less common. For example, there are dynamos that are attached to the fork and driven by the wheel's spokes.

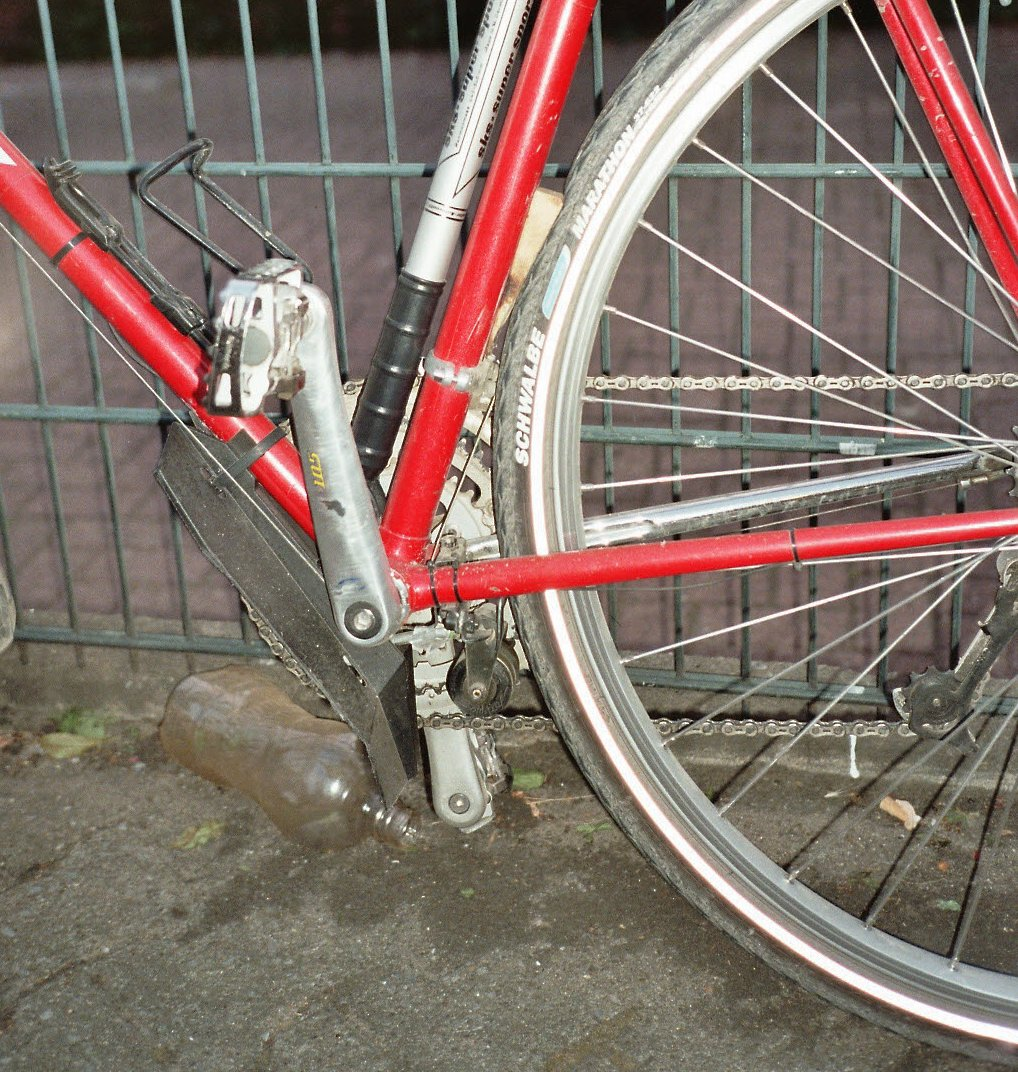
Bottom-bracket dynamo

==== Output and optics ====
Dynamos are generally limited to about 3 W of output power, although the best 12 V hub dynamos can produce 6 W at speed A bottle dynamo is likely to slip if run at twice the nominal power, a hub dynamo does not have this problem.

At speed a dynamo can overpower the lamp, causing it to fail. Historically this was a nuisance, but modern lamps and dynamos often incorporate Zener diodes to prevent overvoltage, and dynamos can be designed to saturate beyond a certain voltage to protect the lamp.

Good dynamos can achieve efficiencies of up to 70% (i.e., under 5 W of the rider's output is diverted to produce 3 W of electricity) and provide good light output at low speeds.

To produce light when the bike is stationary, some dynamo lights have a stand light facility, usually a single blue-white (front light) or red (rear light) LED powered by a capacitor, which runs for around five minutes.

==== Advantages of dynamo lighting ====
- Usage time not limited by battery life
- No recharging or change of batteries necessary
- More environmentally friendly and inexpensive to run than battery-powered lights
- Typically do not have to be removed when the bicycle is parked

==== Disadvantages ====
- Provide no lighting when the bicycle is moving very slowly or is stopped, unless the system is equipped with capacitors or back-up batteries
- Maximum power output obtainable is lower than with batteries
- Difficult to remove by the owner if this is necessary to thwart theft or vandalism, or to use them on more than one bicycle
- Retrofitting a bicycle is more difficult because mounting is more difficult (due to lamp and power source being separate)
- Cheap or poorly aligned dynamos produce noticeable drag
- Old dynamos and lamps did not limit their output voltage, leading to early failure of the incandescent light bulbs in the lamps. Modern lamps and dynamos contain voltage limiters to solve this problem.
- Not suitable for high-power applications outside of lighting, unless designed to recharge an on-board battery.
- Bottle dynamos may be noisy, can be difficult to adjust, can slip under wet conditions, and may wear the sidewall of the tire

=== Magnetic lights ===
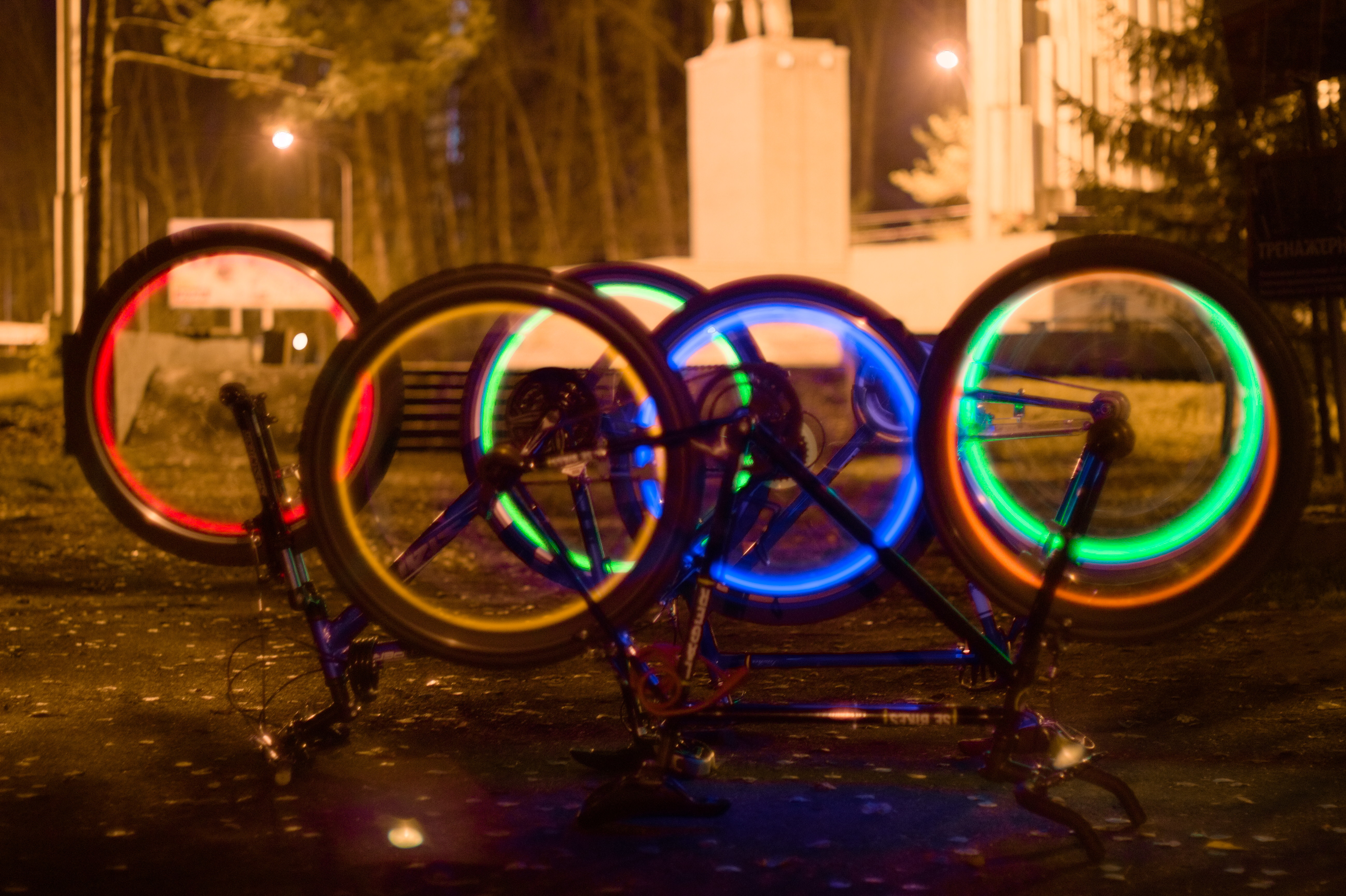
Magnetic bike lights

Lights can be self-powered via electromagnetic induction, eliminating the need for batteries or dynamo systems. The advantages are similar to those of dynamo lighting. The most common design includes a magnet on the wheel spoke and lights with a coil in them, mounted on the frame or fork of the bike. More exotic designs also exist; some have frame-mounted magnets and wheel-mounted lights, or a magnet and an inductor in one casing, using eddy currents.

== Supplementary lighting and visibility ==
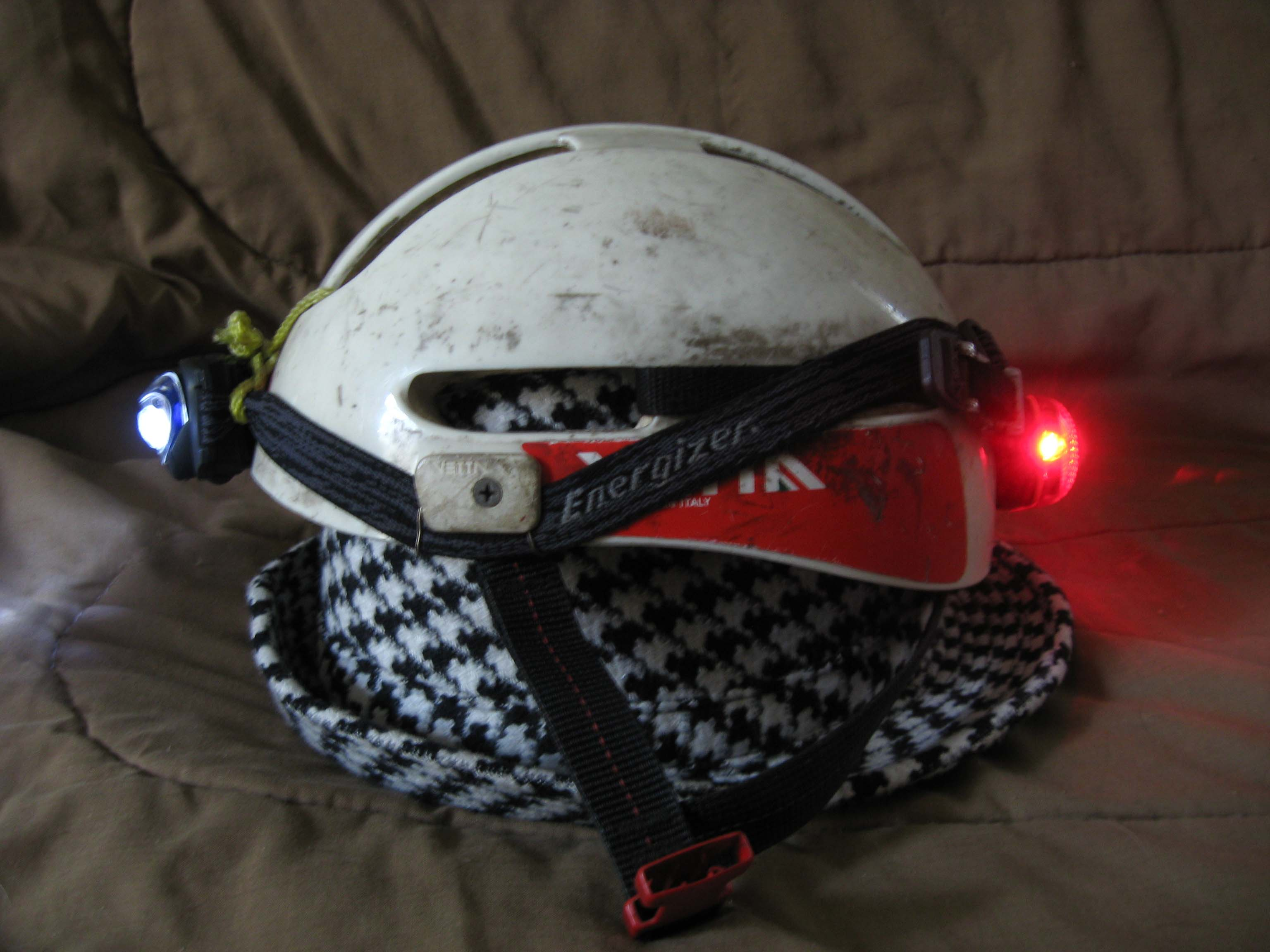

=== Headlamps ===
Headlamps are a useful adjunct to bicycle lights. They can be pointed without steering the bike, giving useful fill-in lighting especially on poor or very dark roads. They have the added safety benefit of positioning the light higher on the cyclist for increased visibility. They also allow the wearer to read road and directional signs placed on high signposts. However, due to the high position of the light the glare may dazzle oncoming traffic.

Some rechargeable systems offer a headlamp option powered from the main battery pack.

=== Reflective and high-visibility materials ===
Retro-reflective materials, in the form of fixed reflectors, reflective tape, and reflective clothing, are useful in making a cyclist visible to other road users. Reflective materials can be applied to bike, rider, or luggage; also, tires are available with reflective sidewalls. Reflectives are visible only when in the beam of a headlight, and even then only within a narrow locus. Importantly, they do nothing to light up the road. Reflectors are not a substitute for lights, but are an important supplement to portable lighting.

==== On the bike ====
Reflectors and reflective tape provide additional visibility (especially when applied to moving parts of the bicycle) and are mandatory in many jurisdictions. Pedal reflectors in particular are very visible to following traffic as they move up and down; unfortunately they are not compatible with most clipless pedal systems, although adaptors are available for some, mainly older SPD models, and a few single-sided designs are available with built-in reflectors. In the UK, where front and rear pedal reflectors are compulsory after dark, most cyclists with clipless pedals are therefore riding illegally. The law is rarely if ever enforced, but could potentially be used in court to reduce financial compensation if the cyclist were to be hit by another vehicle. The CTC have suggested that the requirement should be waived if the cyclist fits an additional rear reflector or lighting, but this was not changed in the last revision of the UK vehicle lighting laws (which permitted flashing LEDs). Riders of recumbent bicycles have pointed out that the pedal reflector requirement is nonsensical for them, since the reflectors point straight up and down in use, and are invisible from other vehicles. As of 2008, California law allows white or yellow shoe reflectors (front and back), or reflective ankle bands, in lieu of pedal reflectors.

==== Clothing ====
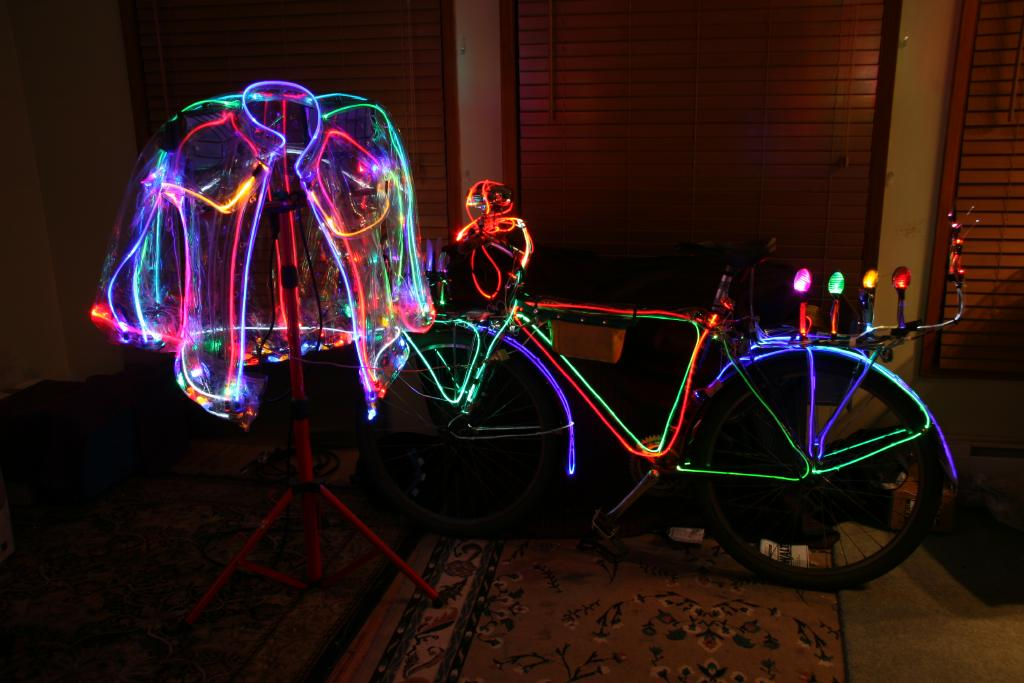
An illuminated bicycle jacket made out of clear vinyl, fiber optics, LEDs, and Christmas Lights that improves rider visibility

In dark conditions, retro-reflective materials will show up boldly in car headlights.

The colour of lighting should be checked in the rider's surroundings. A single solid colour can disappear under artificial light, particularly yellow sodium vapour lighting, and colour blindness is common; red/green colourblindness can make yellow fluorescent vanish against a green background (hedges or grass), although people with red/green colourblindness dispute this. Vests with both yellow and orange fluorescent areas plus wide strips of reflective may be the best solution.

In recent times electroluminescent clothing has become available to add to the existing array of LED-illuminated armbands and helmet blinkies.

=== Wheel-mounted lights ===
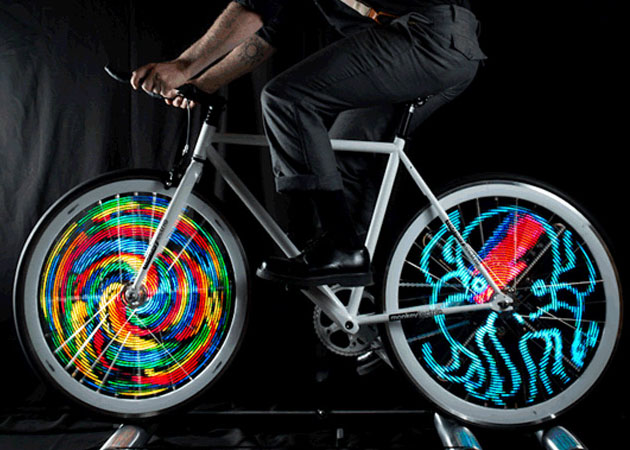
Wheel-mounted bike lights

Wheel-mounted lights are used to improve the visibility of a bike from the side. Due to persistence of vision, individual lights mounted on the moving bike’s wheel spokes are perceived as glowing arcs or circles. There are lights controlled with MCU that are capable of rendering colorful patterns or animations. The glowing rims or wheels can isolate the bike from the visual noise of the city lights and help drivers see and immediately recognize a cyclist. Such lights are mainly battery-powered, but battery-free designs also exist.

== Measures of light output ==
=== Electric power consumption in watts ===
The watt (W) is the unit of power, and is usually quoted for the electrical power input, not the light power output. Electrical power is the product of voltage and current (watts = volts × amperes). Input power is only useful when comparing lights of similar technologies.

=== Luminous intensity in a given direction in candelas ===
The candela (cd) is the SI unit of luminous intensity, that is power per unit solid angle in a given direction, weighted according to the sensitivity of the human eye to various colours of light. A typical candle produces light with about 1 candela of luminous intensity in all directions. A lamp can produce higher luminous intensity either by producing more light, or by focusing it tighter. The luminous intensity of a light depends on many factors, including the colour of the light and the eye's sensitivity to that colour, the optics involved, reflector and lens. Despite its complexity, it is a more useful measure than watts, because it defines how much usable light is shed in a given place: a dynamo headlight designed for road use and focused for seeing the road makes more efficient use of the power of the lamp than lights using rotationally symmetrical optics.

=== Total luminous flux in lumens ===
The lumen (lm) is the SI unit for luminous flux, the total amount of light emitted by a source, weighted according to the sensitivity of the human eye to various colours of light. Lumens per watt is a common measure of the efficacy of a light source. The luminous flux is of less value for bicycle lighting due to the importance of directionality. Luminous intensity is much more useful, but lumens per watt is a handy way to compare the output of otherwise similar lights.

=== Illuminance at a given distance in lux ===
The lux (lx) is this SI unit for illuminance, that is the amount of light that illuminates a surface (the road, in the case of a bike light) per unit area at a given point, weighted according to the sensitivity of the human eye to various colours of light. Some manufacturers indicate the illuminance their front lights provide to the road at a point located a standard distance right in front of the bicycle.
