= Simples =

Simples may refer to:

- Simple (philosophy), in contemporary mereology, any thing that has no proper parts
- Simples, term for medicinal herbs in some herbals
- "Simples!", catchphrase in the Compare the Meerkat advertising campaign

== See also ==
- Simple
