= Simplicity (photography) =

Photographic technique

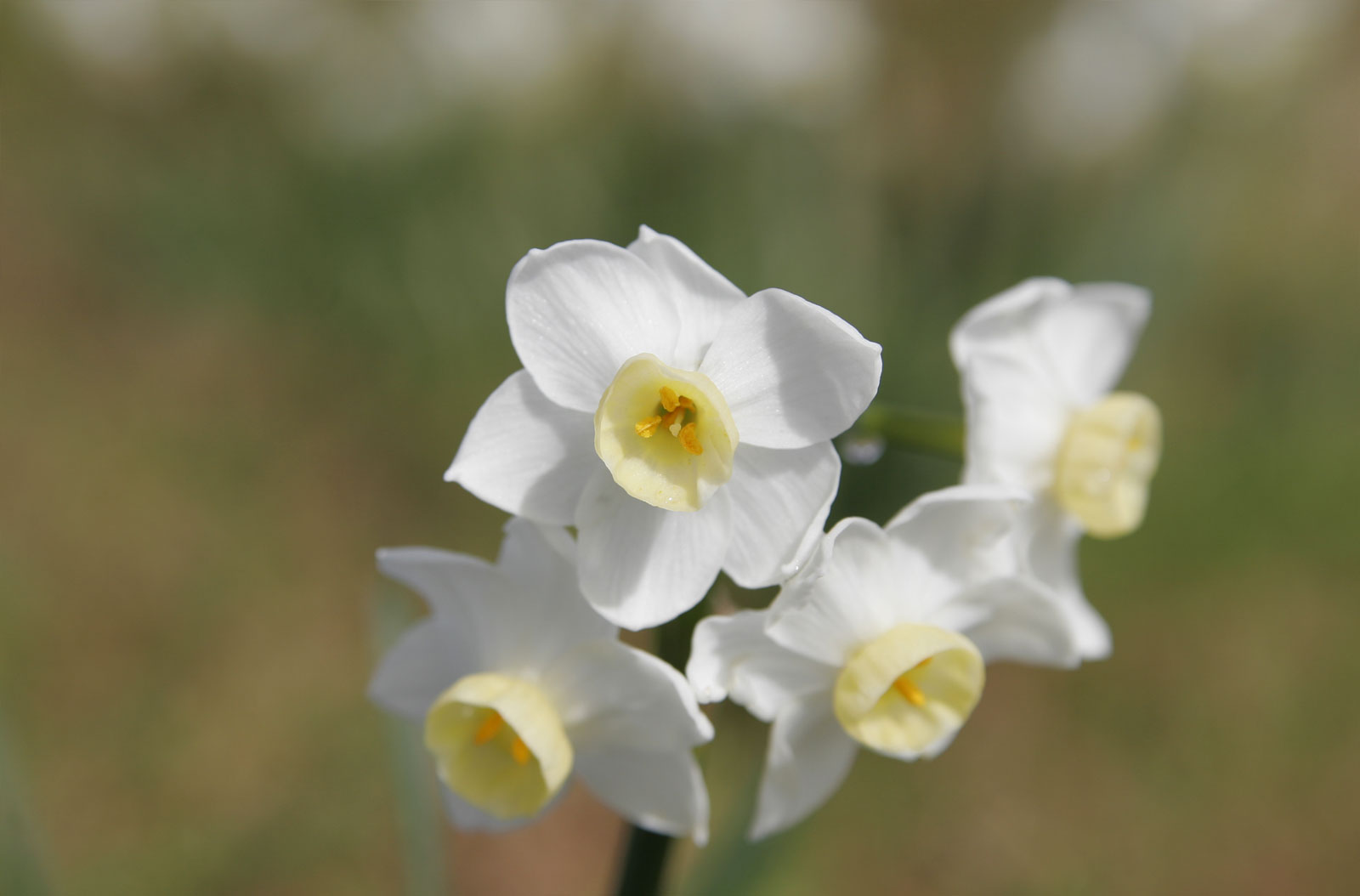
This Bokeh example of simplicity focuses on the flowers, without extraneous background detail.

Several methods can achieve simplicity in a photograph. One of the simplest is to place the subject against a neutral background such as a backdrop or the sky. Backgrounds can be entirely neutral, like a solid backdrop or a cloudless sky; or they can complement the image, like a starfish on the sand.

A more technical method of achieving simplicity involves focusing on the subject while ensuring the background is out of focus. Macro settings on digital cameras tend to do this automatically, as they have a narrow depth of field to begin with; the same effect can be achieved with manual adjustment.

A photograph showing simplicity should have a clear reason the subject was chosen. The reason for taking the picture should be clearly evident. All unrelated topics should not be present. This relates to shallow depth of field as well, which blurs out the background and focuses on what is the main subject of the photograph. Whether the subject is in the center or otherwise does not matter as this is strictly a product of photographic composition.

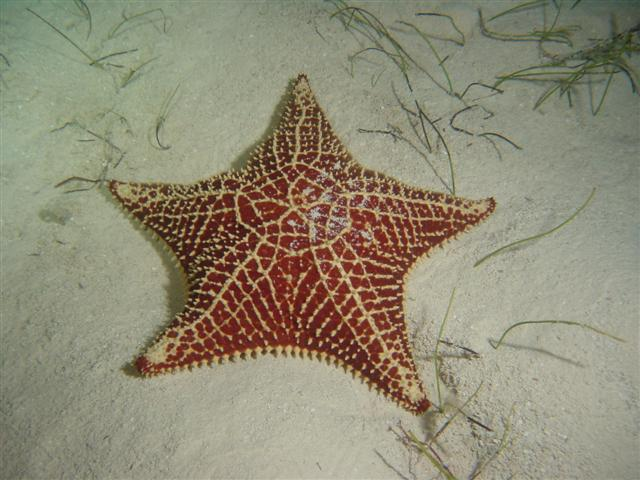
A starfish against a neutral background

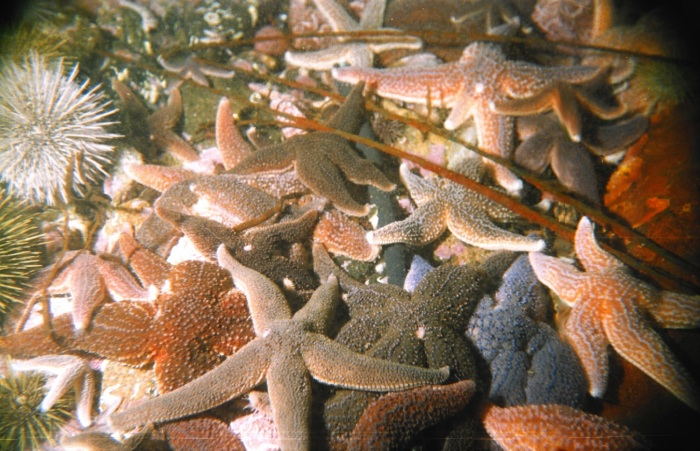
A starfish against a crowded background

== See also ==
- Bokeh
- Defocus aberration
- Shallow focus
