= Photographic composition =

Arranging of visual elements

Photographic composition involves arranging visual elements within a frame to create a visually appealing and impactful image. This includes considering placement of subjects, negative space, and other elements to guide the viewer's eye and highlight the main subject. Photographic composition techniques are used to set up the elements of a picture. These are the techniques which resemble the way we humans normally see a view.

Some of the main techniques are:

- Simplicity (photography)
- Symmetrical balance
- Asymmetrical balance
- Radial balance
- Rule of thirds
- Leading lines
- Framing (photography)
- Centered composition
- Diagonal triangles
- Rule of odds
- Rule of space
- Fill the Frame
- Patterns
- Textures

The composition techniques in photography are guidelines to help beginners capture eye-catching images and provide a starting point until an individual is able to begin capturing images through more advanced techniques.

== See also ==
- Composition (visual arts)
