= Simple Song =

Simple Song may refer to:

- Simple Song (album), a 2009 album by Ben Wendel
- "Simple Song" (The Shins song), 2012
- "Simple Song", a song by Avail rom the 1996 album 4am Friday
- "Simple Song", a song by Lyle Lovett from the 1987 album Pontiac
- "Simple Song", a song by Miley Cyrus from the 2008 album Breakout
- "Simple Song", a song by Passenger from the 2017 album The Boy Who Cried Wolf
- "Simple Song#3", a song by Sumi Jo from the 2015 film Youth

== See also ==
- Simple (disambiguation)#Songs
