= Simpel =

Swiss bicycle manufacturer

Simpel GmbH is a Swiss bicycle manufacturer. Its bikes are sold under the "Simpel.ch" brand. The company's headquarters is Maschwanden in the Canton of Zürich.

Simpel was founded in 2000 by Philip Douglas and Joachim Schneebeli. The business idea was a low-maintenance and durable city bike distributed over the Internet. To that end, Simpel used only hub gear and hub dynamos. The frame number stamped into the frame is also an e-mail address through which the owners of lost bicycles can be contacted.

Simpel is the manufacturer of the "bike 12", introduced in 2012 as the third model of Swiss army bicycle or Ordonnanzfahrrädern for the Swiss army. Its predecessors were the Ordonnanzrad 05 from Schwalbe, Cäsar, Cosmos and Condor (1900-1989) and the Bicycle 93 from Villiger and Condor (1993-1995).
