= Sempill =

Sempill or Semple may refer to:

== People ==
- Francis Sempill (1616?–1682), Scottish writer, son of Robert the younger
- James Sempill (1566–1626), Scottish courtier and diplomat
- Hugh Sempill (1596–1654), Scottish mathematician
- Robert Sempill (c.1530–1595), Scottish balladeer
- Robert Sempill the younger (1595?–1663?), Scottish writer, son of Robert
- William Forbes-Sempill, 19th Lord Sempill (1893–1965), Scottish pioneering aviator and Japanese spy

== Other uses ==
- Clan Sempill, a Lowland Scottish clan
- Lord Sempill, a title in the Peerage of Scotland
- Sempill Mission, a 1921 military mission to Japan
