= Hub dynamo =

Electrical generator in a bicycle wheel

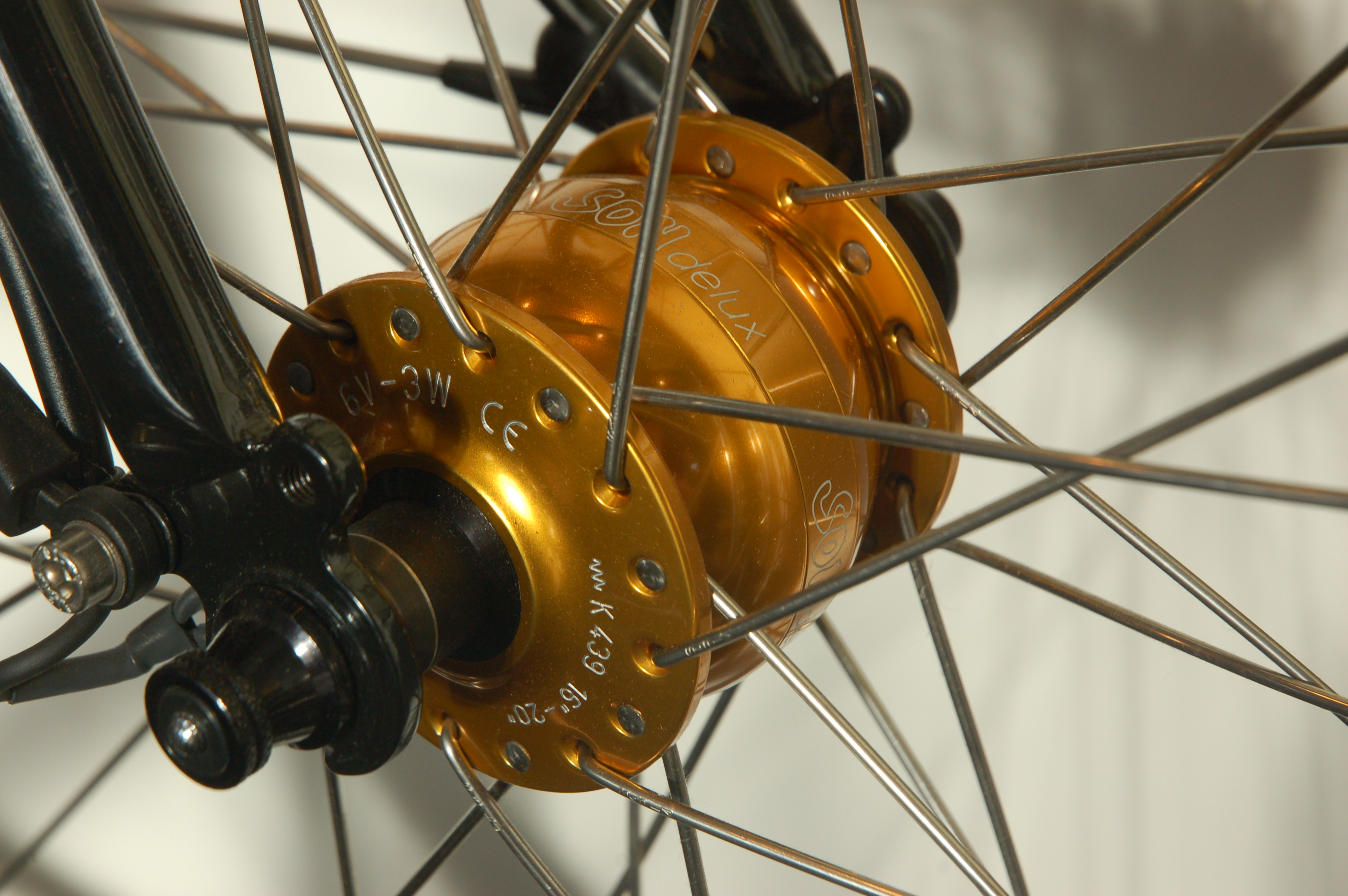
A Schmidts Original Nabendynamo (SON) brand hub dynamo

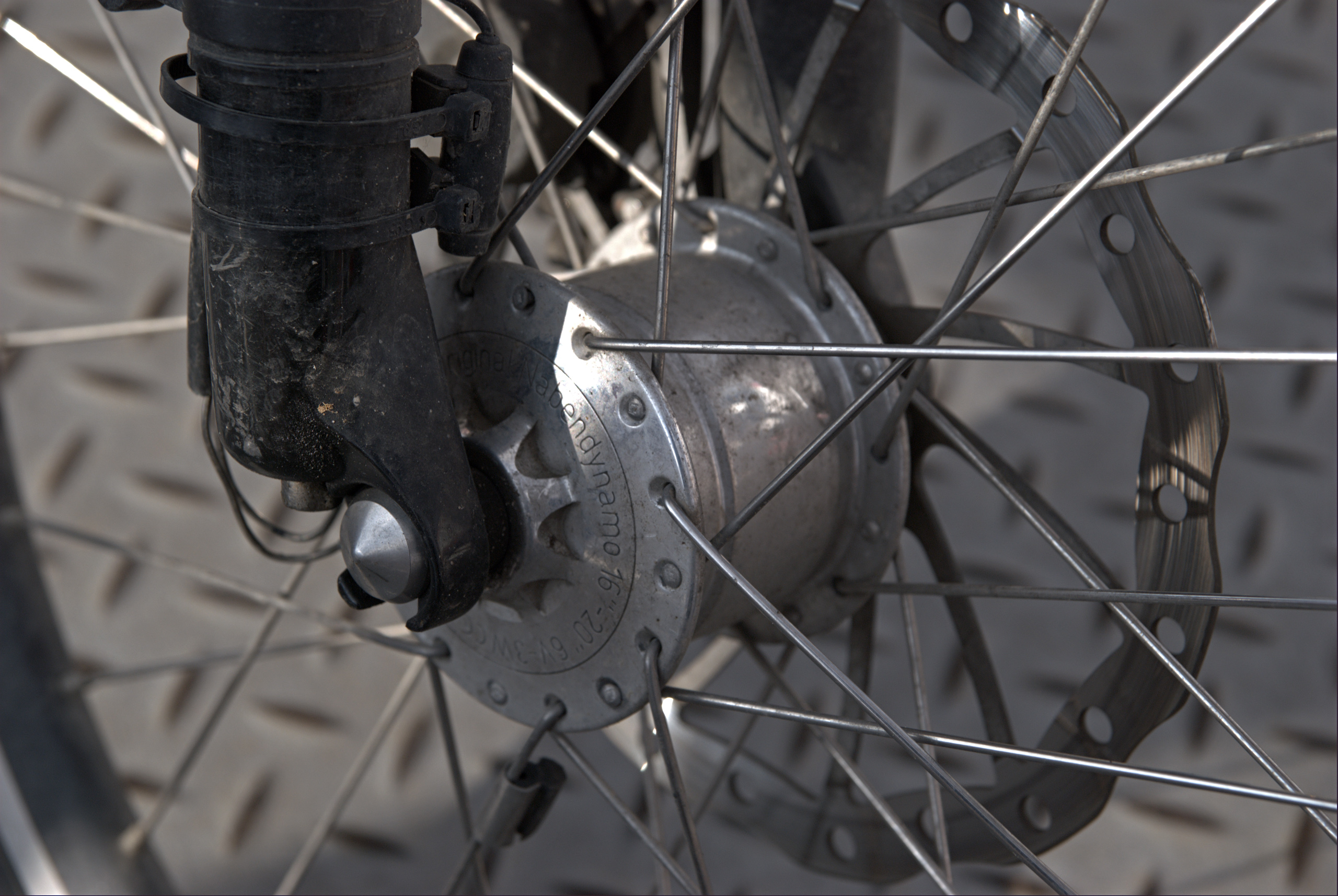
Another SON dynamo

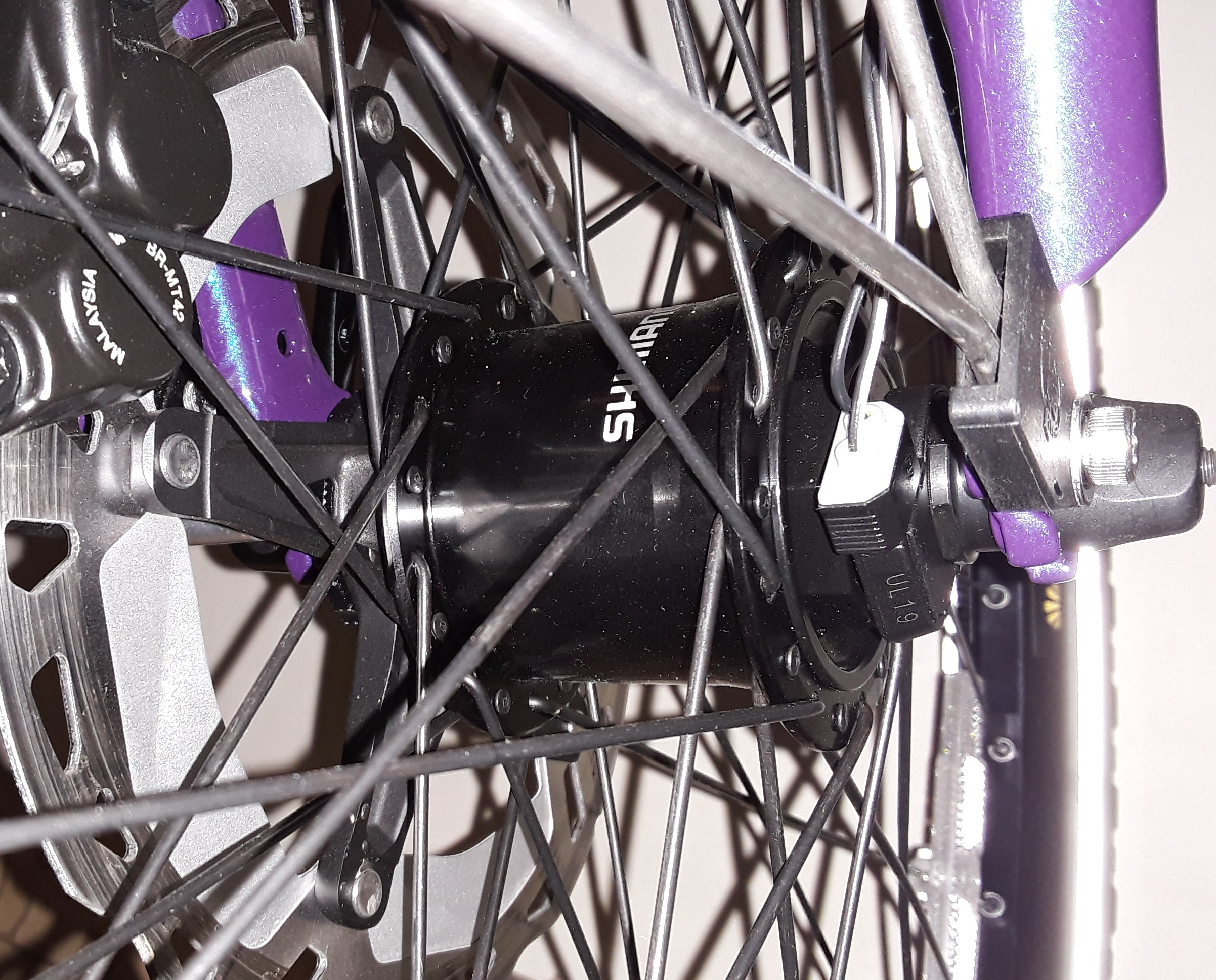
A Shimano dynamo hub

A hub dynamo is a small electrical generator built into the hub (usually front hub) of a bicycle wheel that is usually used to power lights. Often the hub "dynamo" is not actually a dynamo, which creates DC, but a low-power magneto that creates AC. Most modern hub dynamos are regulated to 3 watts at 6 volts (likely due to German Road Traffic Licensing Regulations "StVZO" requirements), although some will drive up to 6 watts at 12 volts.

== Models ==
The market was largely pioneered by Sturmey-Archer with their Dynohub of the 1930s–1970s. This competed effectively with contemporaneous bottle dynamos and bottom-bracket generators, but the Dynohub was heavy with its steel housing and was discontinued in the 1980s. Around 2009, Sturmey-Archer released new hub dynamo/drum brake units with an aluminum housing, designated X-FDD and XL-FDD.

The Schmidt Original Nabendynamo (SON) can power two 6-volt lamps in series at speeds above about 19 km/h (12 mph), and Schmidt manufactures lamps designed to facilitate this. These lamps have optics based on the Bisy FL road lights. The efficiency of the SON is quoted by the manufacturers at 65% (so just over 5 W of the rider's output is diverted to produce 3 W of electrical power) but this applies at only 15 km/h (9 mph). At higher speeds the efficiency falls. Bicycle dynamos instead use permanent magnets to eliminate the need for a battery to excite the field and initiate electrical generation.

Shimano offers a variety of hub dynamos under the "Nexus" brand, such as the DH-3N70/DH-3N71, advertised as having significantly less drag than the Nexus NX-30.

SRAM manufactured the i-Light hub dynamo until 2017. The D7 series was available for both rim and disc brakes while the D3 series featured several rim brake varieties. In a 2006 review by the German Stiftung Warentest, the efficiency at 15 km/h (9 mph) of a D1 series i-Light hub dynamo was 66%, 10% better than a SON-28.

SR Suntour offered the DH-CT-630 hub dynamo series with integrated overvoltage protection. It was apparently discontinued in 2010, as it is absent from 2011 and later SR Suntour catalogs.

SP Dynamo Systems offers about 10 different models of hub dynamos. Quick release hubs for disc brakes and rim brakes. Also a 15 mm thru-axle for mountain bikes with disc brakes. They claim a very high efficiency and light weight compared to other hub dynamos currently on the market.

Kasai makes a series of Dynacoil hub dynamos for rim and disc brakes with both quick-release and through-axle models. In 2020 they introduced the FS line of field serviceable hubs that can be repaired or serviced. Unlike most hub dynamos that require unlacing the wheel and sending the hub back to the factory to repair the dynamo or replace bearings, the FS hubs are serviceable by the user or a local bike shop. Kasai claims 72% efficiency for the hub at 16 km/h(10 mph).

The insides of a broken hub dynamo. The stator is missing a cable and rust has formed due to water ingress.

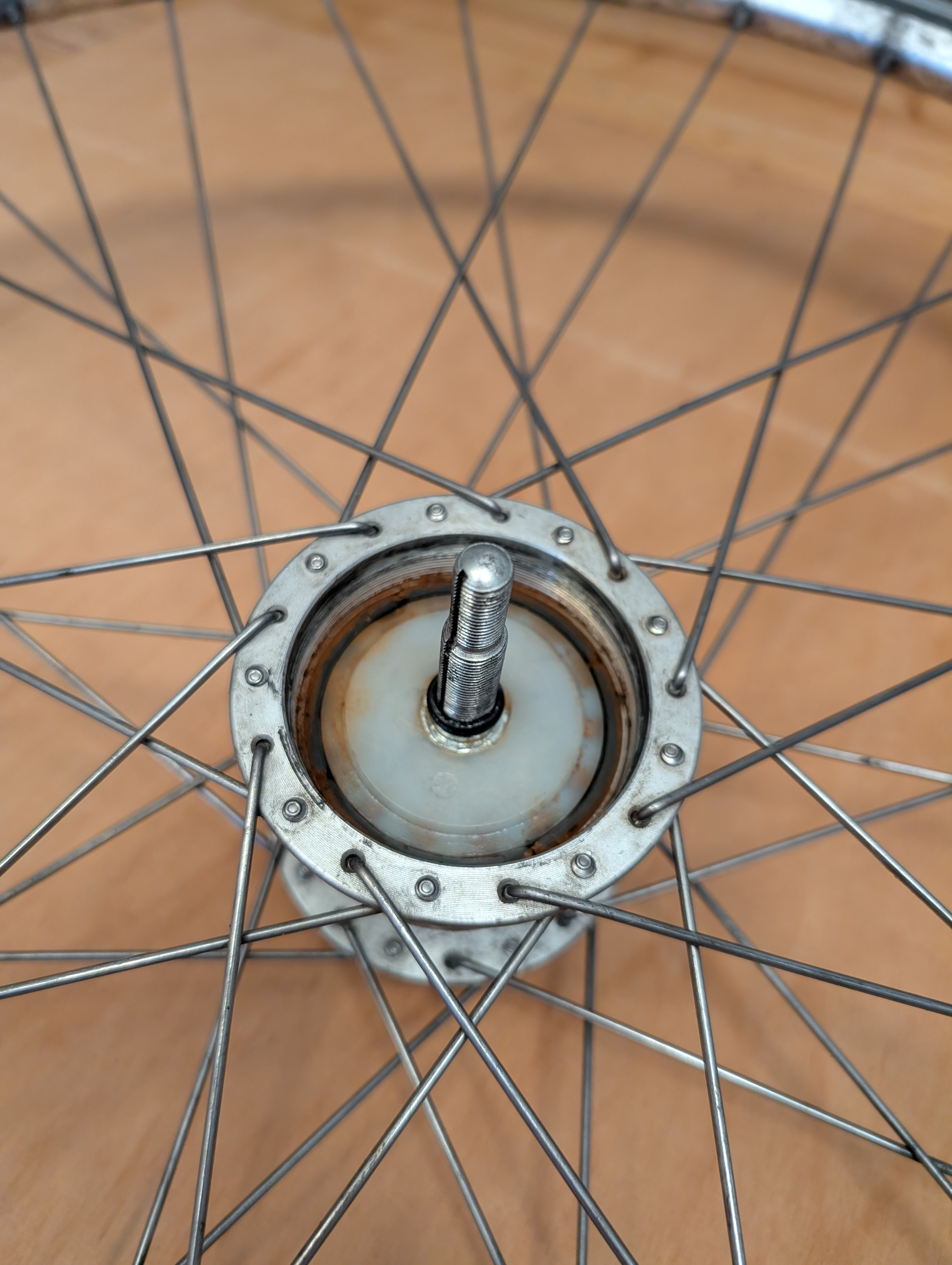
Stator within the hub shell. The gap between them is barely visible.

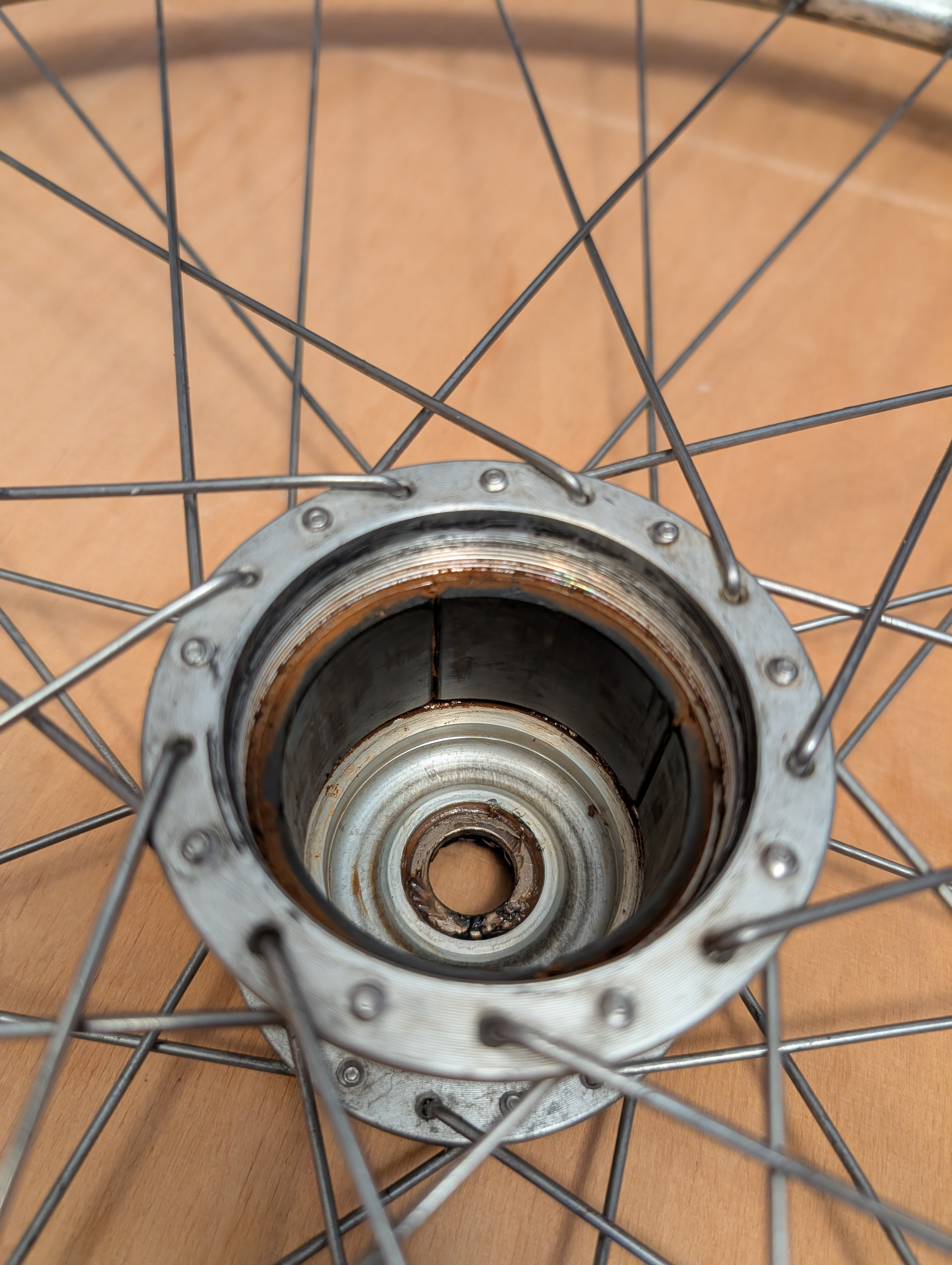
Permanent magnets on the inside of the hub shell.

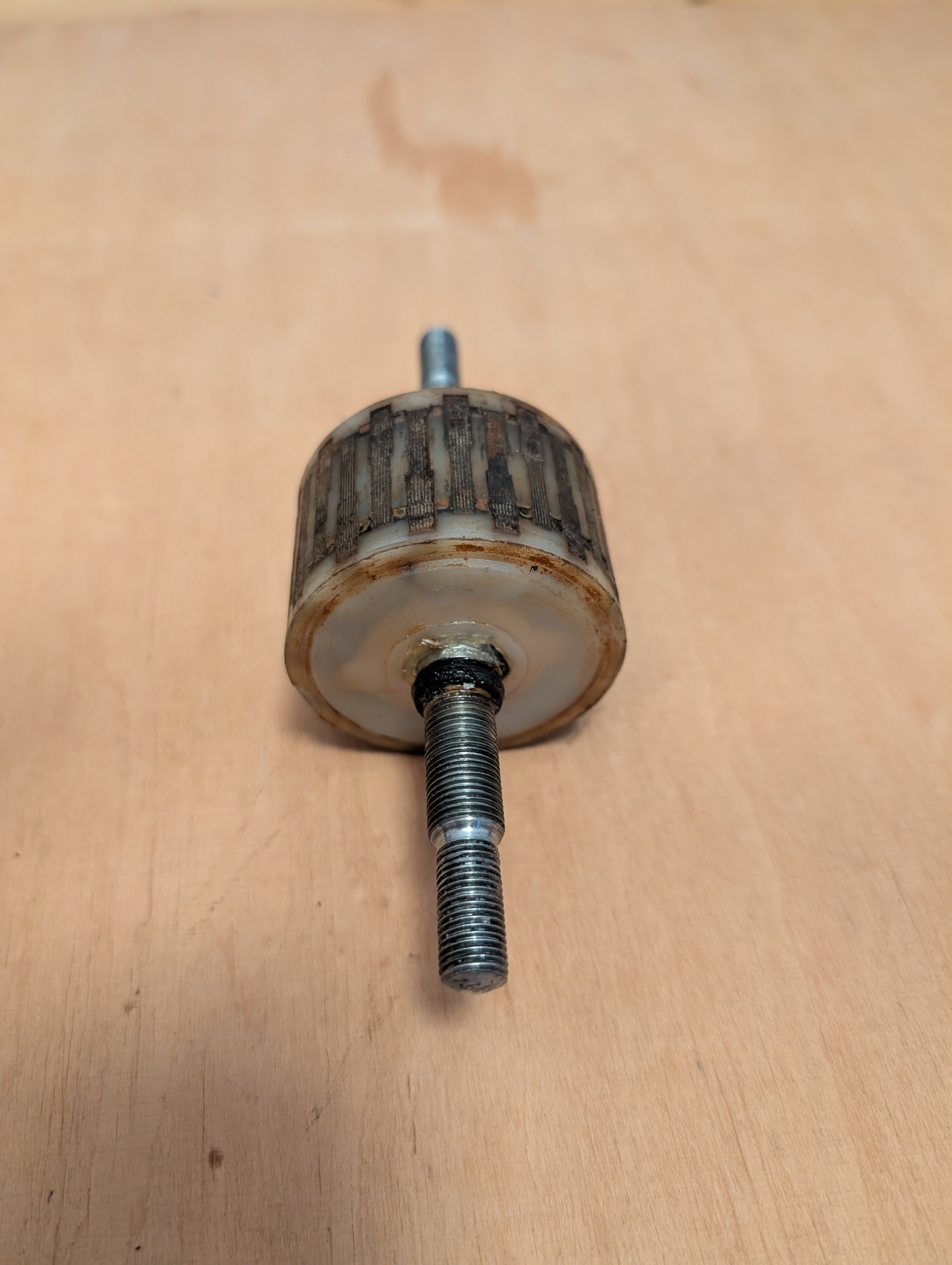
Stator with coils.

== Efficiency ==
Improvements in design and materials have led to improvements in efficiency. Early designs had multiple copper windings and heavier magnets. Modern designs utilize stronger neodymium magnets, a single copper coil winding, and claw poles. Bicycle Quarterly reviewed seven different hub dynamos in 2005. The SON28 was found to be the most efficient, although its cost was significantly higher than models from Shimano.

== See also ==
- Bottle dynamo
- Dynamo
