= Simplification =

Simplification, Simplify, or Simplified may refer to:

== Mathematics ==
Simplification is the process of replacing a mathematical expression by an equivalent one that is simpler (usually shorter), according to a well-founded ordering. Examples include:

- Simplification of algebraic expressions, in computer algebra
- Simplification of Boolean expressions i.e., logic optimization
- Simplification by conjunction elimination in inference in logic yields a simpler, but generally non-equivalent formula
- Simplification of fractions

== Science ==
- Approximations simplify a more detailed or difficult to use process or model

== Linguistics ==
- Simplification of Chinese characters
- Simplified English (disambiguation)
- Text simplification

== Music ==
- Simplify, a 1999 album by Ryan Shupe & the RubberBand
- Simplified (band), a 2002 rock band from Charlotte, North Carolina
- Simplified (album), a 2005 album by Simply Red
- "Simplify", a 2008 song by Sanguine
- "Simplify", a 2018 song by Young the Giant from Mirror Master

== See also ==
- Muntzing (simplification of electric circuits)
- Reduction (mathematics)
- Simplicity
- Oversimplification
  - Dumbing down
