= Simply =

Simply may refer to:

- Simply (Blossom Dearie album), 1982
- Simply (K. T. Oslin album), 2015
- "Simply", a song by De La Soul from the 2001 album AOI: Bionix
- Simply (software company), an Israeli software company
- Simply Market, a French supermarket chain
- Simply Beverages, an American fruit juice company

== See also ==
- Simple (disambiguation)
