= Headlamp tester =

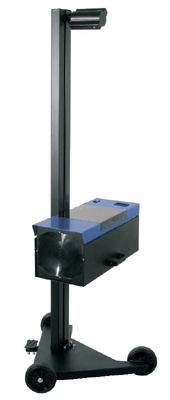
A typical headlamp tester

A headlamp tester, also known as headlamp aligner or beam setter, is an instrument to check both the orientation and intensity of a vehicle headlamp beam to ensure that it meets a minimum standard for the country of use of the vehicle. In the United Kingdom, a headlamp beam tester is used to assess the headlight during a MOT test but in order to be used it must be approved as suitable for use in the scheme. A list of acceptable headlight testers for use within this test scheme is listed on the Department of Transport website.

A headlight tester comprises a fully adjustable single optical collimated light lens assembly which is typically mounted on a vertical column or rail. The assembly is adjusted vertically to the actual height of the headlamp, which is typically around 500mm for passenger vehicles, but can be significantly higher for heavy goods vehicles (HGVs).

The optical lens itself is designed to focus the headlamp pattern on a screen. At the top of the lens mounting column is typically a mirror or laser which allows the headlight tester to be aligned with the longitudinal axis of the presented vehicle.

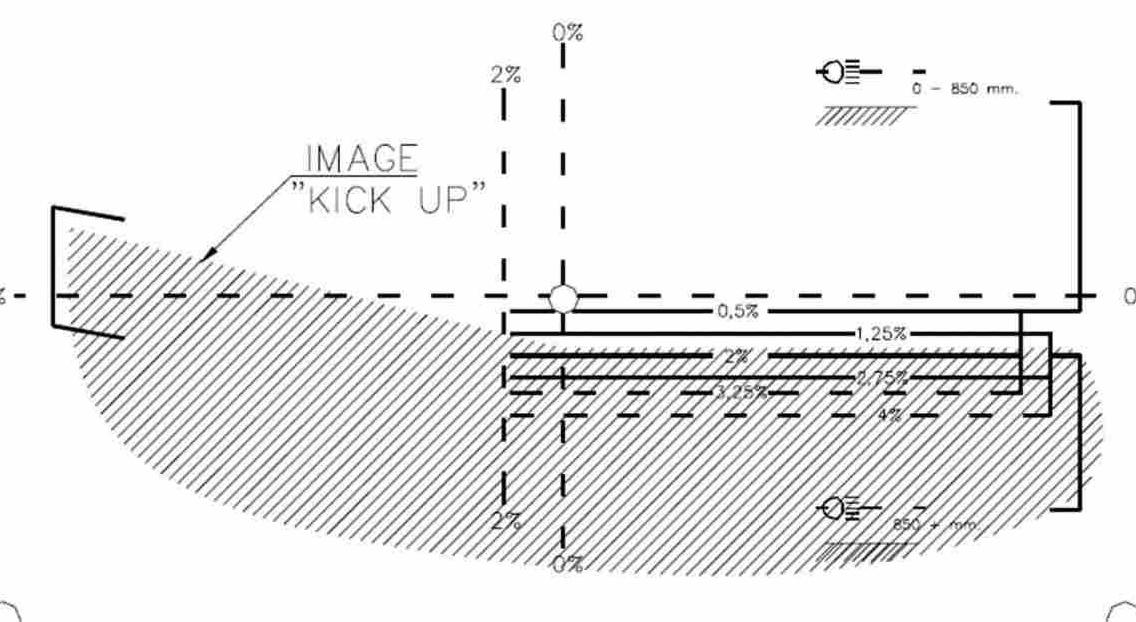
Detail of the aiming screen target used to measure headlamp alignment.

During a headlamp inspection, the vehicle headlamp is aimed through the lens, projecting the headlamp pattern at an aiming screen target which has lines showing the desired headlamp pattern. For low beam, this pattern is symmetric for the United States, asymmetric for the rest of the world. The screen will either be adjusted for, or directly show, the percentage of downwards aim of the headlights. The aim will typically be as low as 1% for passenger cars, and can be as high as 4% for HGVs. The aim, horizontally and vertically, can be adjusted by adjustment screws on the headlamp mounting assembly.

A feature often included as part of such a tester is a method by which the intensity of the beam can be measured. This is achieved with a light meter (also called Lux meter) which is incorporated within the assembly itself. This can be used to not only measure the intensity of the dipped beams but also to measure and compare the full beam intensity.

== See also ==
- Headlight flashing
