= Simplicity =

State of being simple

Simplicity is the state or quality of being simple. Something easy to understand or explain seems simple, in contrast to something complicated. Alternatively, as Herbert A. Simon suggests, something is simple or complex depending on the way we choose to describe it. In some uses, the label "simplicity" can imply beauty, purity, or clarity. In other cases, the term may suggest a lack of nuance or complexity relative to what is required.

The concept of simplicity is related to the field of epistemology and philosophy of science (e.g., in Occam's razor). Religions also reflect on simplicity with concepts such as divine simplicity. In human lifestyles, simplicity can denote freedom from excessive possessions or distractions, such as having a simple living style. In some cases, the term may have negative connotations, as when referring to someone as a simpleton.

== In philosophy of science ==
There is a widespread philosophical presumption that simplicity is a theoretical virtue. This presumption that simpler theories are preferable appears in many guises. Often it remains implicit; sometimes it is invoked as a primitive, self-evident proposition; other times it is elevated to the status of a ‘Principle’ and labeled as such (for example, the 'Principle of Parsimony'.

According to Occam's razor, all other things being equal, the simplest theory is most likely true. In other words, simplicity is a meta-scientific criterion by which scientists evaluate competing theories.

A distinction is often made by many persons between two senses of simplicity: syntactic simplicity (the number and complexity of hypotheses), and ontological simplicity (the number and complexity of things postulated). These two aspects of simplicity are often referred to as elegance and parsimony respectively.

John von Neumann defines simplicity as an important esthetic criterion of scientific models:

[...] (scientific model) must satisfy certain esthetic criteria - that is, in relation to how much it describes, it must be rather simple. I think it is worth while insisting on these vague terms - for instance, on the use of word rather. One cannot tell exactly how "simple" simple is. [...] Simplicity is largely a matter of historical background, of previous conditioning, of antecedents, of customary procedures, and it is very much a function of what is explained by it.

== In business ==
The recognition that too much complexity can have a negative effect on business performance was highlighted in research undertaken in 2011 by Simon Collinson of the Warwick Business School and the Simplicity Partnership, which found that managers who are orientated towards finding ways of making business "simpler and more straightforward" can have a beneficial impact on their organisation.

Most organizations contain some amount of complexity that is not performance enhancing, but drains value out of the company. Collinson concluded that this type of 'bad complexity' reduced profitability (EBITDA) by more than 10%.

Collinson identified a role for "simplicity-minded managers", managers who were "predisposed towards simplicity", and identified a set of characteristics related to the role, namely "ruthless prioritisation", the ability to say "no", willingness to iterate, to reduce communication to the essential points of a message and the ability to engage a team. His report, the Global Simplicity Index 2011, was the first ever study to calculate the cost of complexity in the world's largest organisations.

The Global Simplicity Index identified that complexity occurs in five key areas of an organisation: people, processes, organisational design, strategy, and products and services. As the "global brands report", the research is repeated and published annually. The 2022 report incorporates a "brand simplicity score" and an "industry simplicity score".

Research by Ioannis Evmoiridis at Tilburg University found that earnings reported by "high simplicity firms" are higher than among other businesses, and that such firms "exhibit[ed] a superior performance during the period 2010 - 2015", whilst requiring lower average capital expenditure and lower leverage.

== In religion ==
Simplicity is a theme in the Christian religion. According to St. Thomas Aquinas, God is infinitely simple. The Roman Catholic and Anglican religious orders of Franciscans also strive for personal simplicity. Members of the Religious Society of Friends (Quakers) practice the Testimony of Simplicity, which involves simplifying one's life to focus on what is important and disregard or avoid what is least important. Simplicity is tenet of Anabaptistism, and some Anabaptist groups like the Bruderhof, make an effort to live simply.

== Lifestyle ==
In the context of human lifestyle, simplicity can denote freedom from excessive material consumption and psychological distractions.

== Quotes ==
"Receive with simplicity everything that happens to you." —Rashi (French rabbi, 11th century), citation at the beginning of the film A Serious Man (2009), Coen Brothers

== See also ==
- Ambiguity aversion
- Concision
- Complexity
- Degree of difficulty
- Elegance
- KISS principle
- Minimalism
- Occam's razor
- Simple living
- Simplicity theory
- Simplification (disambiguation)
- Testimony of Simplicity
- Volatility, uncertainty, complexity and ambiguity
- Worse is better
- John Maeda – 10 Laws of Simplicity
