= Dynamo =

Electrical generator that produces direct current with the use of a commutator

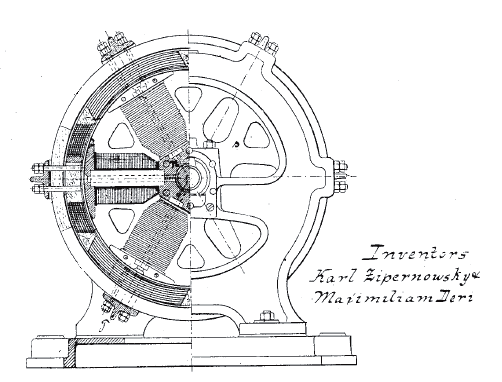
"Dynamo Electric Machine" (end view, partly section, U.S. patent 284,110)

A dynamo is an electrical generator that creates direct current using a commutator, and uses self-powering electromagnets for the stator field rather than permanent magnets. Dynamos are self-starting by using residual magnetic field left in the iron cores of the electromagnets (i.e. field coils). If a dynamo were never run before, it was usual to use a separate battery to excite or flash the field of the electromagnets to enable self-starting. Dynamos were the first practical electrical generators capable of delivering power for industry, and the foundation upon which many other later electric-power conversion devices were based, including the electric motor, the alternating-current alternator, and the rotary converter.

Today, the simpler and more reliable alternator dominates large scale power generation, for efficiency, reliability and cost reasons. A dynamo has the disadvantages of a mechanical commutator. Also, converting alternating to direct current using rectifiers (such as vacuum tubes or more recently via solid state technology) is effective and usually economical.

== History ==
=== Induction with permanent magnets ===
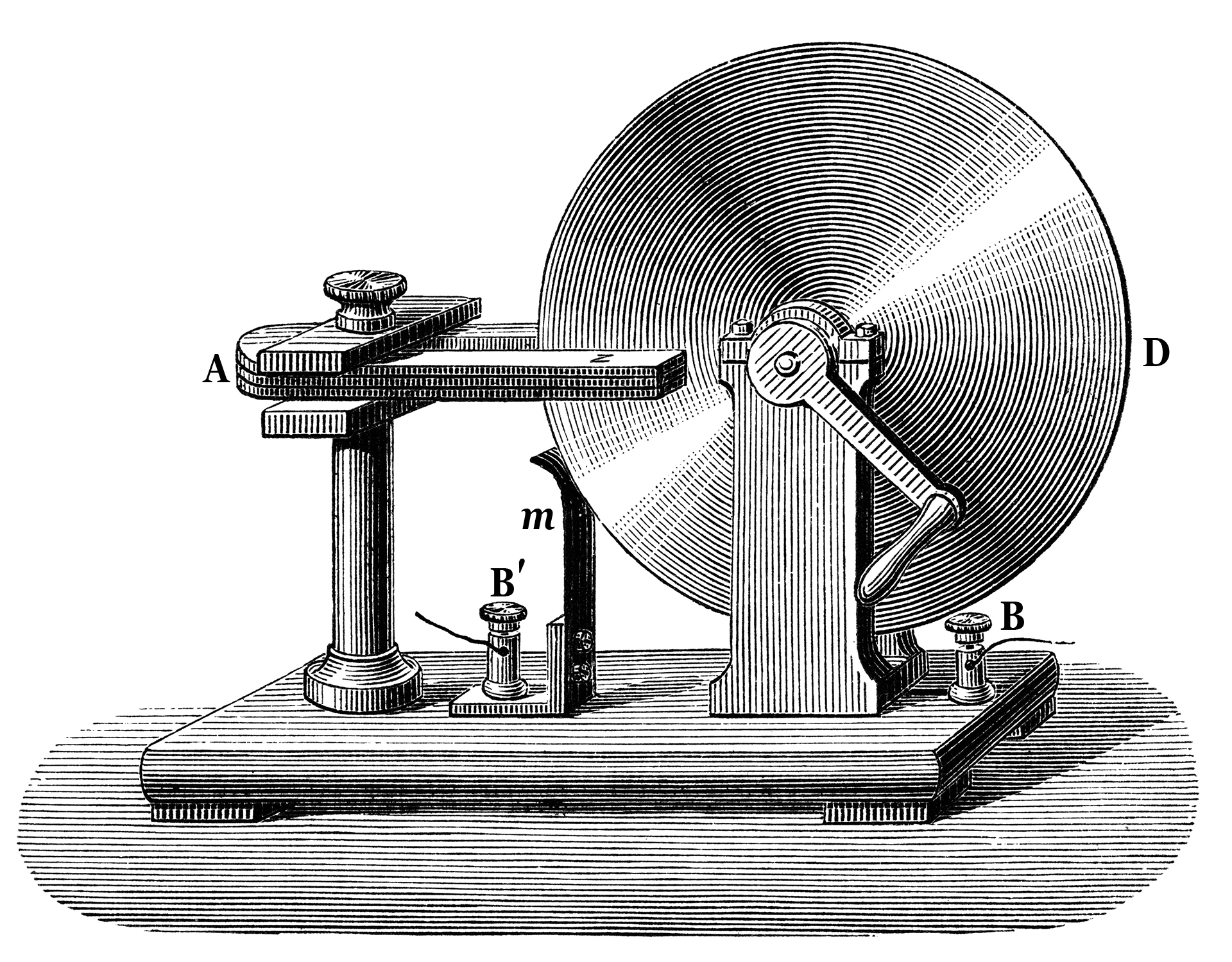
The Faraday disk was the first electric generator. The horseshoe-shaped magnet (A) created a magnetic field through the disk (D). When the disk was turned, this induced an electric current radially outward from the center toward the rim. The current flowed out through the sliding spring contact m (connected to B') through the external circuit, and back through B to the center of the disk through the axle

The operating principle of electromagnetic generators was discovered in the years 1831–1832 by Michael Faraday. The principle, later called Faraday's law, is that an electromotive force is generated in an electrical conductor which encircles a varying magnetic flux.

He also built the first electromagnetic generator, called the Faraday disk, a type of homopolar generator, using a copper disc rotating between the poles of a horseshoe magnet. It produced a small DC voltage. This was not a dynamo in the current sense, because it did not use a commutator.

This design was inefficient, due to self-cancelling counterflows of current in regions of the disk that were not under the influence of the magnetic field. While current was induced directly underneath the magnet, the current would circulate backwards in regions that were outside the influence of the magnetic field. This counterflow limited the power output to the pickup wires, and induced waste heating of the copper disc. Later homopolar generators would solve this problem by using an array of magnets arranged around the disc perimeter to maintain a steady field effect in one current-flow direction.

Another disadvantage was that the output voltage was very low, due to the single current path through the magnetic flux. Faraday and others found that higher, more useful voltages could be produced by winding multiple turns of wire into a coil. Wire windings can conveniently produce any voltage desired by changing the number of turns, so they have been a feature of all subsequent generator designs, requiring the invention of the commutator to produce direct current.

=== First dynamos ===
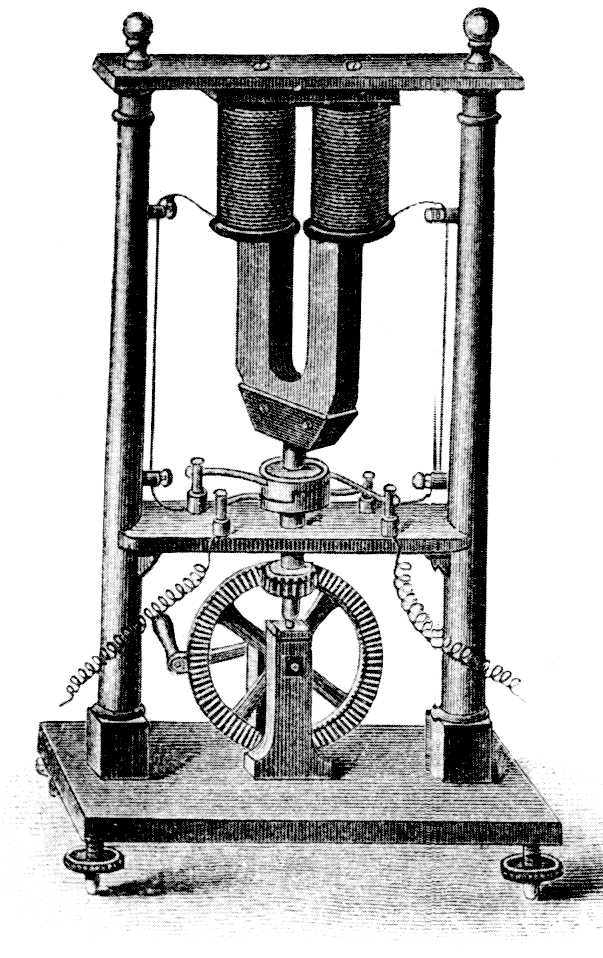
Hippolyte Pixii's dynamo. The commutator is located on the shaft below the spinning magnet

The first commutated dynamo was built in 1832 by Hippolyte Pixii, a French instrument maker. It used a permanent magnet which was rotated by a crank. The spinning magnet was positioned so that its north and south poles passed by a piece of iron wrapped with insulated wire.

Pixii found that the spinning magnet produced a pulse of current in the wire each time a pole passed the coil. However, the north and south poles of the magnet induced currents in opposite directions. To convert the alternating current to DC, Pixii invented a commutator, a split metal cylinder on the shaft, with two springy metal contacts that pressed against it.

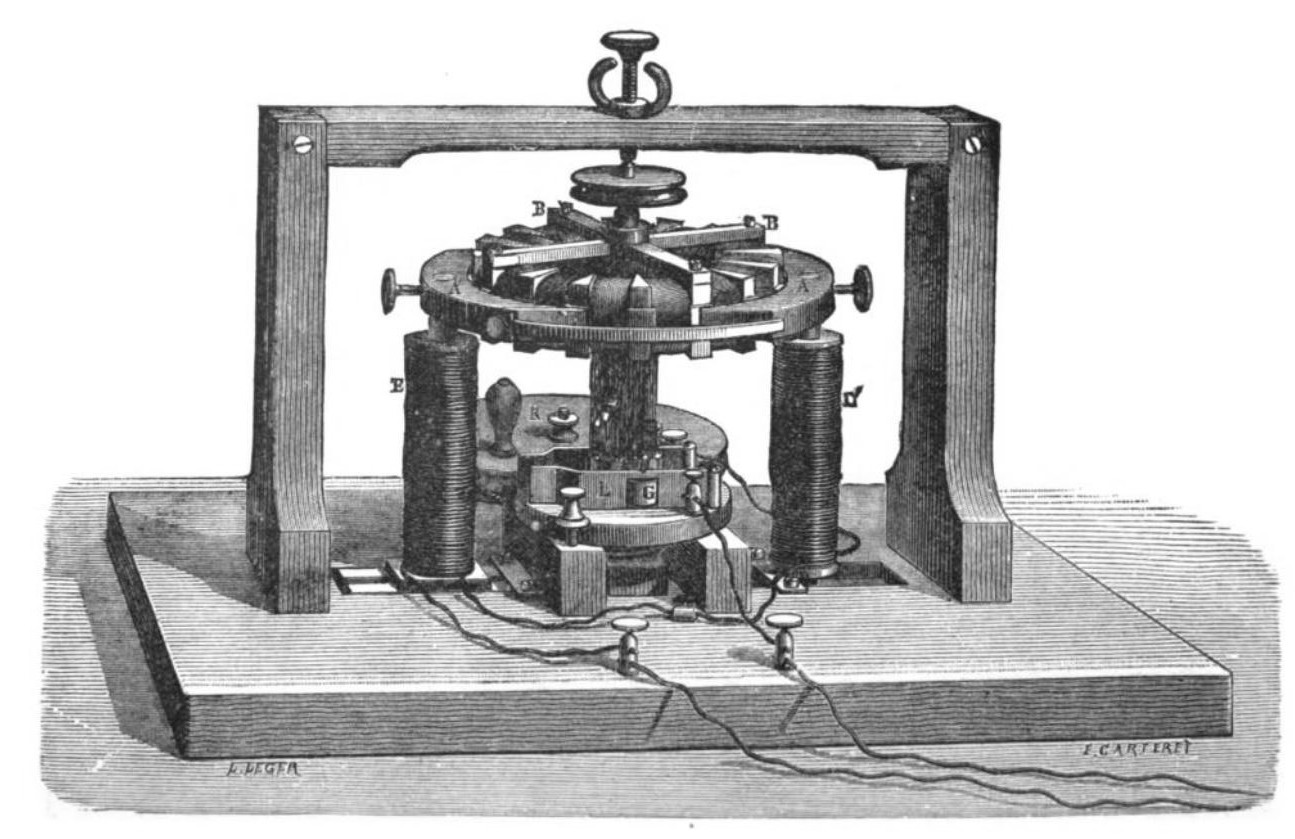
Pacinotti dynamo, 1860

This early design had a problem: the electric current it produced consisted of a series of "spikes" or pulses of current separated by none at all, resulting in a low average power output. As with electric motors of the period, the designers did not fully realize the seriously detrimental effects of large air gaps in the magnetic circuit.

Antonio Pacinotti, an Italian physics professor, solved this problem around 1860 by replacing the spinning two-pole axial coil with a multi-pole toroidal one, which he created by wrapping an iron ring with a continuous winding, connected to the commutator at many equally spaced points around the ring; the commutator being divided into many segments. This meant that some part of the coil was continually passing by the magnets, smoothing out the current.

The Woolrich Electrical Generator of 1844, now in Thinktank, Birmingham Science Museum, is the earliest electrical generator used in an industrial process. It was used by the firm of Elkingtons for commercial electroplating.

=== Self excitation ===
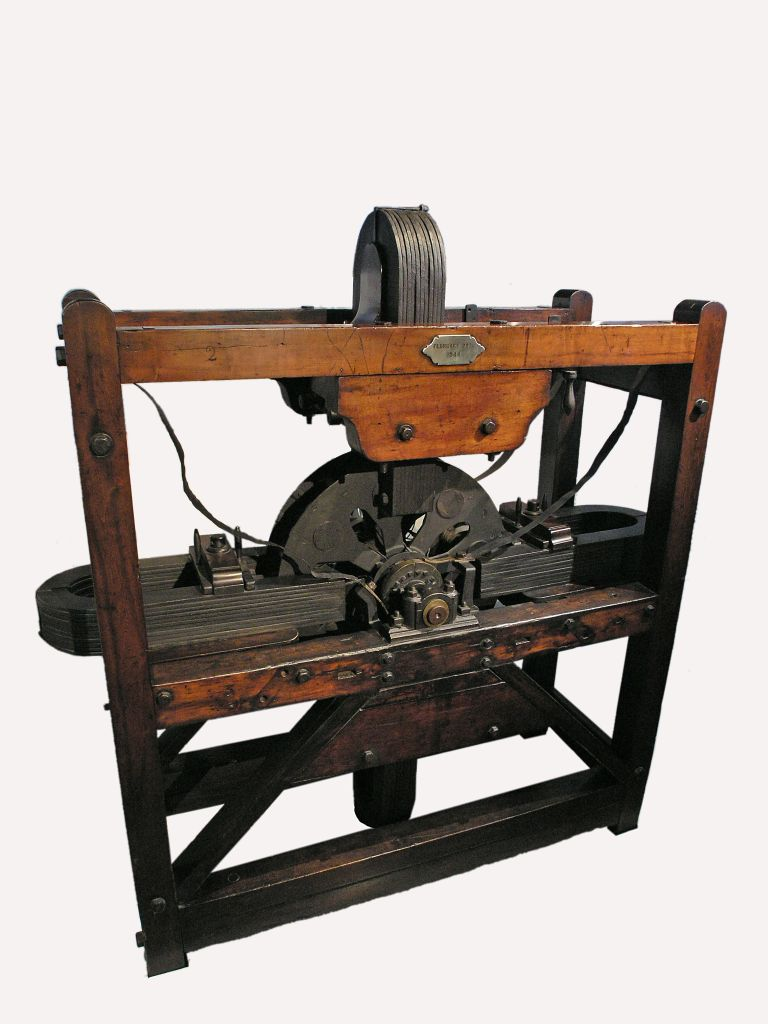
The Woolrich Electrical Generator in Thinktank, Birmingham

In 1827, independently of Faraday, Hungarian inventor Ányos Jedlik started experimenting with electromagnetic rotating devices which he called electromagnetic self-rotors. In the prototype of the single-pole electric starter, both the stationary and the revolving parts were electromagnetic.

Around 1856, six years before Siemens and Wheatstone, Jedlik formulated the concept of the dynamo, but did not patent it as he thought he was not the first to realize the idea. Instead of permanent magnets, his dynamo used two electromagnets placed opposite to each other in order to induce a magnetic field around the rotor. This was also the discovery of the principle of dynamo self-excitation, which replaced permanent magnet designs.

=== Practical designs ===
The dynamo was the first electrical generator capable of delivering power for industry. The modern dynamo, fit for use in industrial applications, was invented by Henry Wilde with his paper presented to The Royal Society by Michael Faraday on 26th March 1866. It was independently invented by Sir Charles Wheatstone, Werner von Siemens and Samuel Alfred Varley. Varley took out a patent on 24 December 1866, while Siemens and Wheatstone both announced their discoveries on 17 January 1867, by delivering papers at the Royal Society.

The "dynamo-electric machine" employed self-powering electromagnetic field coils rather than permanent magnets to create the stator field. Wheatstone's design was similar to Siemens', with the difference that in the Siemens design the stator electromagnets were in series with the rotor, but in Wheatstone's design they were in parallel. The use of electromagnets rather than permanent magnets greatly increased the power output of a dynamo and enabled high power generation for the first time. This invention led directly to the first major industrial uses of electricity. For example, in the 1870s Siemens used electromagnetic dynamos to power electric arc furnaces for the production of metals and other materials.

The dynamo machine that was developed consisted of a stationary structure, which provides the magnetic field, and a set of rotating windings which turn within that field. On larger machines the constant magnetic field is provided by one or more electromagnets, which are usually called field coils.

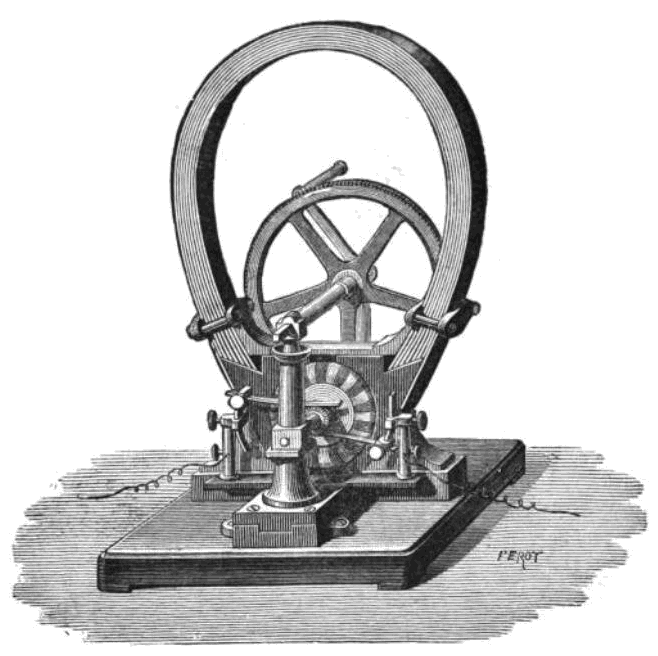
Small Gramme dynamo, around 1878

Zénobe Gramme reinvented Pacinotti's design in 1871 when designing the first commercial power plants operated in Paris. An advantage of Gramme's design was a better path for the magnetic flux, by filling the space occupied by the magnetic field with heavy iron cores and minimizing the air gaps between the stationary and rotating parts. The Gramme dynamo was one of the first machines to generate commercial quantities of power for industry. Further improvements were made on the Gramme ring, but the basic concept of a spinning endless loop of wire remains at the heart of all modern dynamos.

Charles F. Brush assembled his first dynamo in the summer of 1876 using a horse-drawn treadmill to power it. Brush's design modified the Gramme dynamo by shaping the ring armature like a disc rather than a cylinder shape. The field electromagnets were also positioned on the sides of the armature disc rather than around the circumference.

=== Rotary converters ===
After dynamos and motors were found to allow easy conversion back and forth between mechanical or electrical power, they were combined in devices called rotary converters, rotating machines whose purpose was not to provide mechanical power to loads but to convert one type of electric current into another, for example DC into AC. They were multi-field single-rotor devices with two or more sets of rotating contacts (either commutators or sliprings, as required), one to provide power to one set of armature windings to turn the device, and one or more attached to other windings to produce the output current.

The rotary converter can directly convert, internally, any type of electric power into any other. This includes converting between direct current (DC) and alternating current (AC), three phase and single phase power, 25 Hz AC and 60 Hz AC, or many different output voltages at the same time. The size and mass of the rotor was made large so that the rotor would act as a flywheel to help smooth out any sudden surges or dropouts in the applied power.

The technology of rotary converters was replaced in the early 20th century by mercury-vapor rectifiers, which were smaller, did not produce vibration and noise, and required less maintenance. The same conversion tasks are now performed by solid state power semiconductor devices. Rotary converters remained in use in the West Side IRT subway in Manhattan into the late 1960s, and possibly some years later. They were powered by 25 Hz AC, and provided DC at 600 volts for the trains.

=== Limitations and decline ===
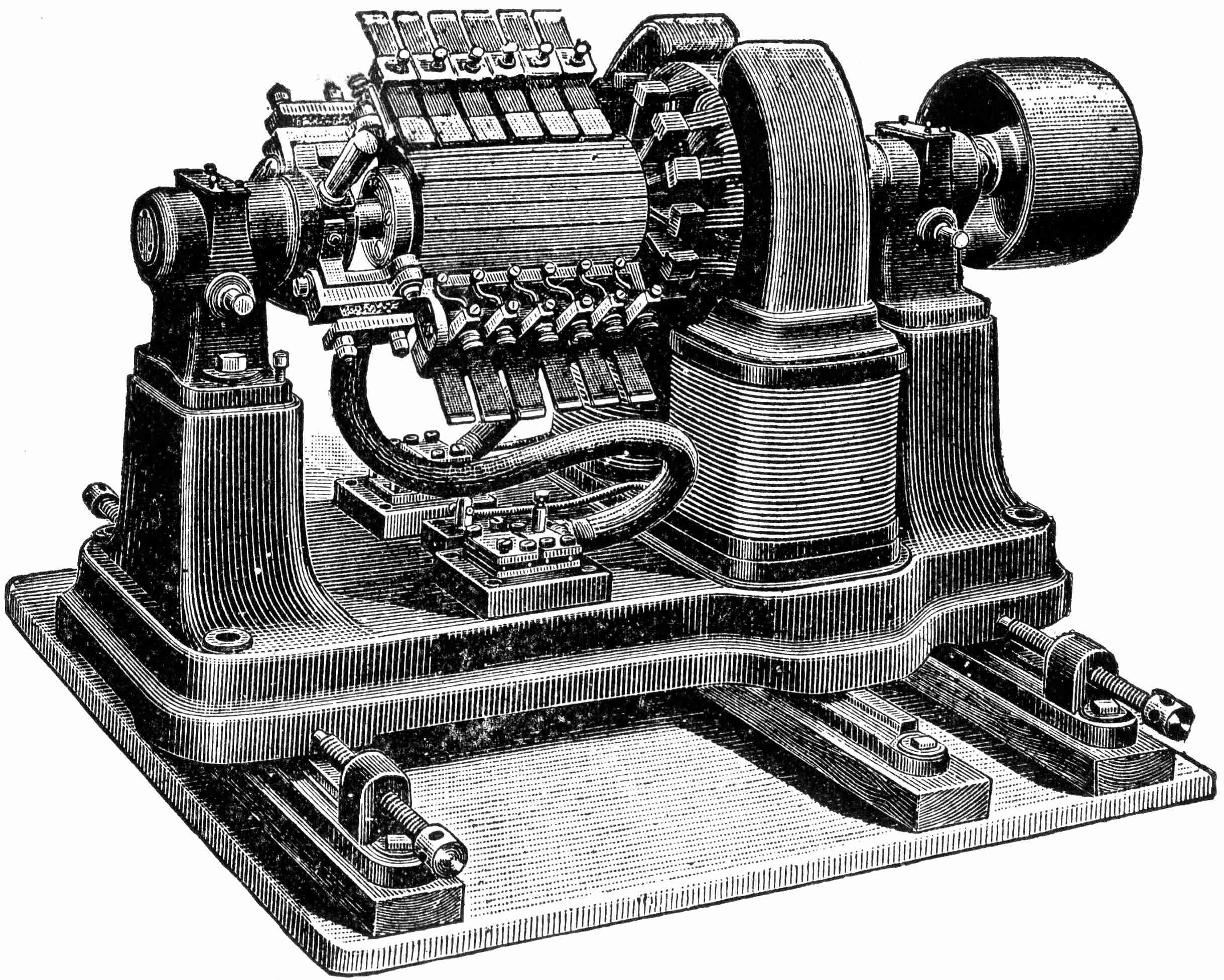
Low voltage dynamo for electroplating from the turn of the century. The resistance of the commutator contacts causes inefficiency in low voltage, high current machines like this, requiring a huge elaborate commutator. This machine generated 7 volts at 310 amps.

Direct current machines like dynamos and commutated DC motors have higher maintenance costs and power limitations than alternating current (AC) machines due to their use of the commutator. These disadvantages are:

- The sliding friction between the brushes and commutator consumes power, which can be significant in a low power dynamo.
- Due to friction, the brushes and copper commutator segments wear down, creating dust. Large commutated machines require regular replacement of brushes and occasional resurfacing of the commutator. Commutated machines cannot be used in low particulate or sealed applications or in equipment that must operate for long periods without maintenance.
- The resistance of the sliding contact between brush and commutator causes a voltage drop called the "brush drop". This may be several volts, so it can cause large power losses in low voltage, high current machines (see the huge commutator of the 7 volt electroplating dynamo in the adjacent picture). Alternating current motors, which do not use commutators, are much more efficient.
- There is a limit to the maximum current density and voltage which can be switched with a commutator. Very large direct current machines, say, with megawatt power ratings, cannot be built with commutators. The largest motors and generators are all alternating-current machines.
- The switching action of the commutator causes sparking at the contacts, posing a fire hazard in explosive atmospheres, and generating electromagnetic interference.

Although direct current dynamos were the first source of electric power for industry, they had to be located close to the factories that used their power. Electricity could only be distributed over distances economically as alternating current (AC), through the use of the transformer. With the 1890s conversion of electric power systems to alternating current, during the 20th century dynamos were replaced by alternators, and are now almost obsolete.

== Etymology ==
The word 'dynamo' (from the Greek word dynamis (δύναμις), meaning force or power) was originally another name for an electrical generator, and still has some regional usage as a replacement for the word generator. The word was coined in 1831 by Michael Faraday, who utilized his invention toward making many discoveries in electricity (Faraday discovered electrical induction) and magnetism.

The original "dynamo principle" of Werner von Siemens referred only to the direct current generators which use exclusively the self-excitation (self-induction) principle to generate DC power. The earlier DC generators which used permanent magnets were not considered "dynamo electric machines". The invention of the dynamo principle (self-induction) was a major technological leap over the old traditional permanent magnet based DC generators. The discovery of the dynamo principle made industrial scale electric power generation technically and economically feasible. After the invention of the alternator and that alternating current can be used as a power supply, the word dynamo became associated exclusively with the 'commutated direct current electric generator', while an AC electrical generator using either slip rings or rotor magnets would become known as an alternator.

A small electrical generator built into the hub of a bicycle wheel to power lights is called a hub dynamo, although these are invariably AC devices, and are actually magnetos.

== Design ==
The electric dynamo uses rotating coils of wire and magnetic fields to convert mechanical rotation into a pulsing direct electric current through Faraday's law of induction. A dynamo machine consists of a stationary structure, called the stator, which provides a constant magnetic field, and a set of rotating windings called the armature which turn within that field. Due to Faraday's law of induction, the motion of the wire within the magnetic field creates an electromotive force, which pushes on the electrons in the metal, creating an electric current in the wire. On small machines, the constant magnetic field may be provided by one or more permanent magnets; larger machines have the constant magnetic field provided by one or more electromagnets, which are usually called field coils.

=== Commutation ===
The commutator is needed to produce direct current. When a loop of wire rotates in a magnetic field, the magnetic flux through it—and thus the potential induced in it—reverses with each half turn, generating an alternating current. However, in the early days of electric experimentation, alternating current generally had no known use. The few uses for electricity, such as electroplating, used direct current provided by messy liquid batteries. Dynamos were invented as a replacement for batteries. The commutator is essentially a rotary switch. It consists of a set of contacts mounted on the machine's shaft, combined with graphite-block stationary contacts, called "brushes," because the earliest such fixed contacts were metal brushes. The commutator reverses the connection of the windings to the external circuit when the potential reverses — so instead of alternating current, a pulsing direct current is produced.

=== Excitation ===
The earliest dynamos used permanent magnets to create the magnetic field. These were referred to as "magneto-electric machines" or magnetos. However, researchers found that stronger magnetic fields — and thus more power — could be produced by using electromagnets (field coils) on the stator. These were called "dynamo-electric machines" or dynamos. The field coils of the stator were originally separately excited by a separate, smaller, dynamo or magneto. An important development by Wilde and Siemens was the discovery (by 1866) that a dynamo could also bootstrap itself to be self-excited, using current generated by the dynamo itself. This allowed the growth of a much more powerful field, thus far greater output power.

Self-excited direct current dynamos commonly have a combination of series and parallel (shunt) field windings, which are directly supplied power by the rotor through the commutator in a regenerative manner. They are started and operated in a manner similar to modern portable alternating current electric generators, which are not used with other generators on an electric grid.

==== Self-start ====
At the very first run the dynamo machine is started by using external source of current such as battery. When it was not operating a residual weak magnetic field always persisted in the iron cores of electromagnets. As the dynamo's rotor begun to rotate while not connected to an external load the residual magnetic field induced a very small electrical current into the rotor windings which in turn was supplied back to electromagnet windings. Even without an external load attached, this small current was enough to produce a magnetic field causing the rotor to produce even more current. In this manner, the self-exciting dynamo builds up its internal magnetic fields until it reaches its normal operating voltage. When it is able to produce sufficient current to sustain both its internal fields and an external load, it is ready to be used.

A self-excited dynamo with insufficient residual magnetic field in the metal frame will not be able to produce any current in the rotor, regardless of what speed the rotor spins. This situation can also occur in modern self-excited portable generators, and is resolved for both types of generators in a similar manner, by applying a brief direct current battery charge to the output terminals of the stopped generator. The battery energizes the windings just enough to imprint the residual field, to enable building up the current. This is referred to as flashing the field.

Both types of self-excited generator, which have been attached to a large external load while it was stationary, will not be able to build up voltage even if the residual field is present. The load acts as an energy sink and continuously drains away the small rotor current produced by the residual field, preventing magnetic field buildup in the field coil.

== Uses ==
=== Historic ===
Dynamos, usually driven by steam engines, were widely used in power stations to generate electricity for industrial and domestic purposes. They have since been replaced by alternators.

Large industrial dynamos with series and parallel (shunt) windings can be difficult to use together in a power plant, unless either the rotor or field wiring or the mechanical drive systems are coupled together in certain special combinations.

Dynamos were used in motor vehicles to generate electricity for battery charging. An early type was the third-brush dynamo. They have, again, been replaced by alternators, which are automatic versions of the dynamo.

=== Modern ===
Dynamos still have some uses in low power applications, particularly where low voltage DC is required, since an alternator with a semiconductor rectifier can be inefficient in these applications.

Hand cranked dynamos are used in clockwork radios, hand powered flashlights and other human powered equipment to recharge batteries.

The generator used for bicycle lighting may be called a "dynamo" but these are almost always AC devices and so, strictly, would be called "alternators".

== See also ==
- Bottle dynamo
- Hub dynamo
- Dynamo theory
- Shunt generator
