= RXC J1504.1−0248 BCG =

Brightest cluster galaxy in the constellation Libra

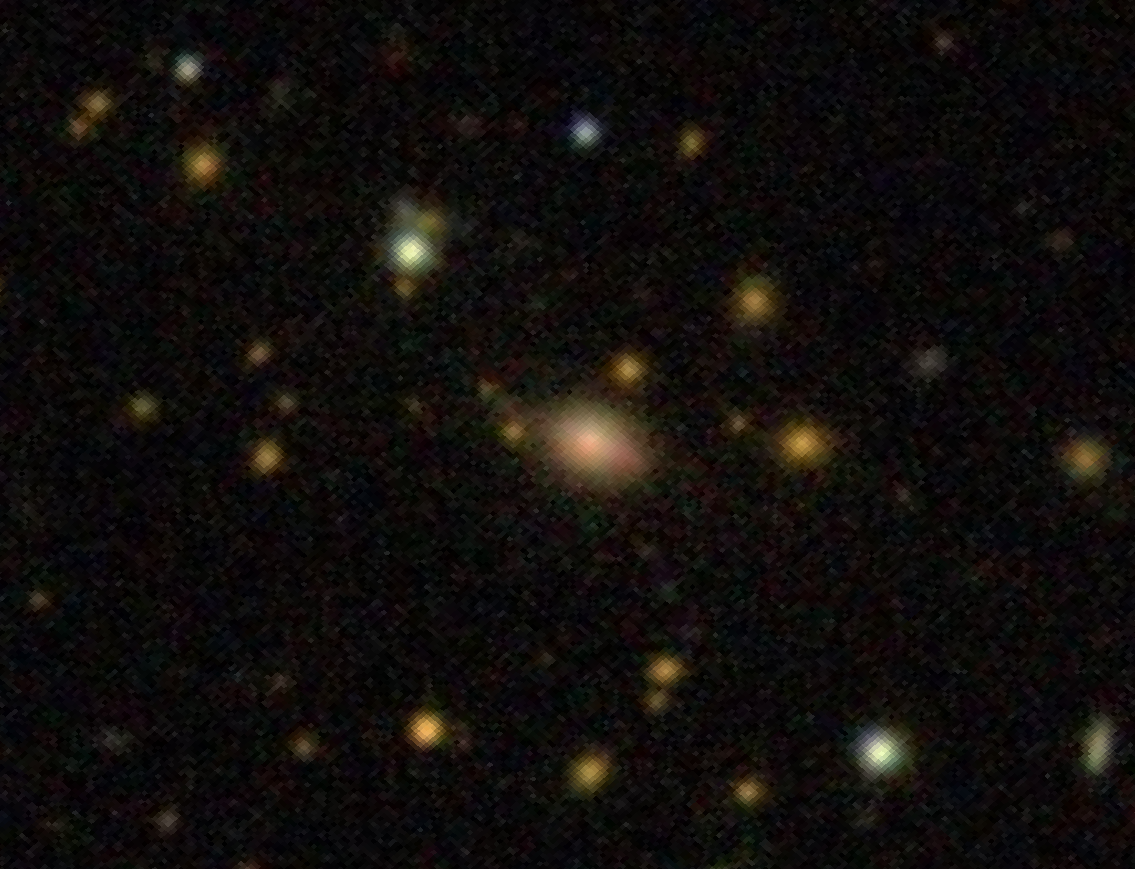
- SDSS image of RXC J1504.1−0248 BCG

Observation data (J2000.0 epoch)
- Constellation: Libra
- Right ascension: 15^{h} 04^{m} 07.51^{s}
- Declination: −02° 48′ 16.62″
- Redshift: 0.216902
- Heliocentric radial velocity: 65,026 km/s ± 5
- Distance: 3.152 Gly (966.43 Mpc)
- Group or cluster: RXC J1504.1−0248
- Apparent magnitude (V): 18.08

Characteristics
- Type: AGN
- Size: ~381,000 ly (116.7 kpc) (estimated)

Other designations
- 6dF J1504075−024817, ASK 201653.0, ICRF J150407.5−024816, IVS B1501−026, OGC 0087, QUEST J1504−0248, LEDA 126345

RXC J1504.1−0248 BCG (short for RXC J1504.1−0248 Brightest Cluster Galaxy) is a large elliptical galaxy residing as the brightest cluster galaxy of an X-ray luminous and cool core galaxy cluster, RXC J1504.1−0248. It is located in the constellation of Libra and it has a redshift of (z) 0.216. It was first discovered by astronomers from the Las Campanas Survey (LCRS) in July 1999.

== Description ==
RXC J1504.1−0248 BCG is found to be the central dominant galaxy of the RXC J1504.1−0248 galaxy cluster. The optical spectrum of the galaxy is described by narrow emission lines of low-excitation, with strong doubly ionized oxygen lines as well as luminous hydrogen alpha and singly ionized neon lines. The absolute magnitude of this galaxy is estimated to be -24.

The nucleus of RXC J1504.1−0248 BCG is found to be active and it has been classified as a low-ionization nuclear emission-line region (LINER) galaxy. When observed, it has found to have two sources that are located both east and west from its optical position. Imaging made with MERLIN, showed the sources as two components with an angular separation of 0.5 arcseconds which in turn, corresponds to around 1,750 parsecs. The flux densities of both components are estimated to be 28.78 ± 0.07 and 0.60 ± 0.07 mJy respectively. The component on the eastern side has a flat radio spectrum at 18–6–3.5 centimeters, while the component on the western side has a steep spectrum that flattens towards short wavelengths. The total brightness of the source is estimated to be 62 mJy at 1.4 GHz frequencies.

The galaxy is described as extremely large. Its appearance is described to be regular and it is found to show no signs of any recent galaxy mergers based on Sloan Digital Sky Survey (SDSS) imaging. A study published in 2010, has found the galaxy has a blue appearance, containing a mix of an old stellar population and a population of young stars. The total star formation rate of the galaxy is estimated to be 140 M_{☉} per year. Evidence also showed most of star formation takes place within the core of the galaxy and also in a filament feature that is 42 kiloparsecs long and it stretches from the core region towards southwest. An ionized nebula is found to surround the galaxy with the total estimated double ionized oxygen luminosity being 4.7 × 10^{43} erg s^{−1}. There is a presence of filamentary structure located from north-east to south-west that is found either crossing or being associated with the emission originated from the central region of the galaxy. The north-east part of the filament is also shown to have an extension and orientated by 55°.

The supermassive black hole in the center of RXC J1504.1−0248 BCG is estimated to be 2 × 10^{9} M_{☉}. Evidence also showed the black hole is also shown to be accreting at around 0.03 M_{☉} per year. A study published in 2007, has suggested the black hole has a mass of around 3 × 10^{7} M_{☉} based on a silicon line width. Evidence also found the galaxy also contains molecular gas estimated to have a mass of 1.9 ± 0.1 × 10^{10} M_{☉} with around 80% of it being distributed in the region located within five kiloparsecs from the center. This region is also contains both a large clump feature and a smaller clump in the northeast direction. A long filament feature is found extending in southeast direction from the nucleus and contains around of 4.8 × 10^{9} M_{☉} of the gas.
