= Critical field resistance =

Critical field resistance is a term that is associated with a shunt DC generator. In a DC shunt generator, the voltage induced across the armature, V_{a}, is directly proportional to the flux acting across it. The flux in a DC generator is directly proportional to the field current, I_{f}. The critical field resistance is defined as the maximum field circuit resistance (for a given speed) with which the shunt generator would just excite. The shunt generator will build up voltage only if field circuit resistance is less than critical field resistance.

It is a tangent to the open-circuit characteristics of the generator (at a given speed).
