= Third-brush dynamo =

Device for charging motor vehicle batteries

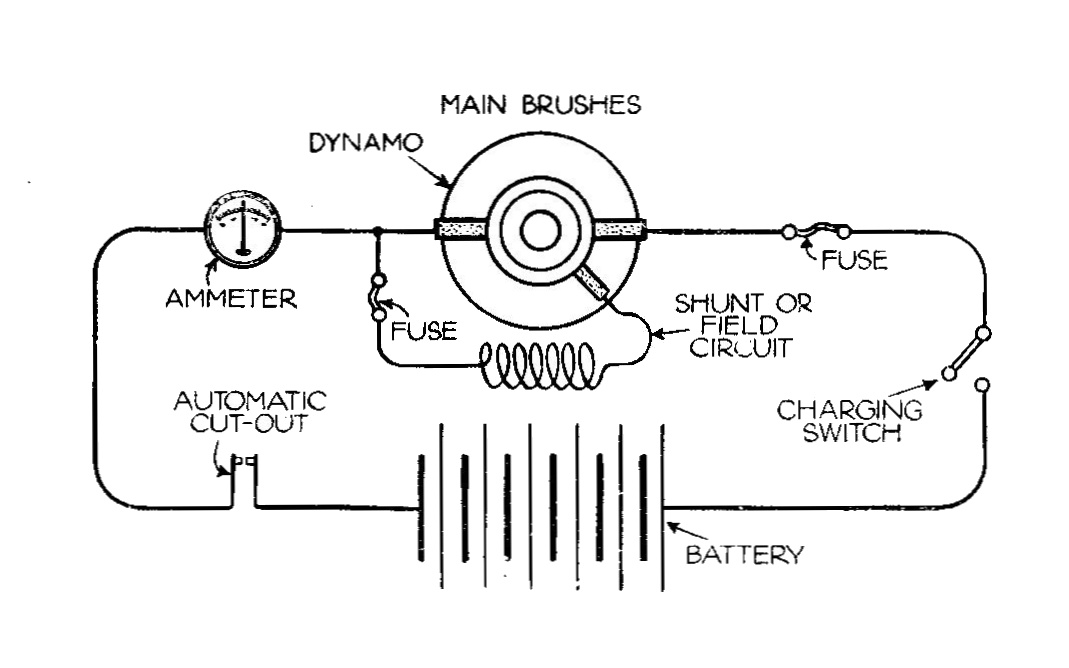
Three-brush dynamo charging circuit

A third-brush dynamo was a type of dynamo, an electrical generator, formerly used for battery charging on motor vehicles. It was superseded, first by a two-brush dynamo equipped with an external voltage regulator, and later by an alternator.

== Construction ==
As the name implies, the machine had three brushes in contact with the commutator. One was earthed to the frame of the vehicle and another was connected (through a reverse-current cut-out) to the live terminal of the vehicle's battery. The third was connected to the field winding of the dynamo. The other end of the field winding was connected to a switch which could be adjusted (by inserting or removing resistance) to give "low" or "high" charge. This switch was sometimes combined with the vehicle's light switch so that switching on the headlights simultaneously put the dynamo in high charge mode.

== Disadvantages ==
The third-brush dynamo had the advantage of simplicity but, by modern standards, it gave poor voltage regulation. This led to short battery life as a result of over-charging or under-charging.

== See also ==
- Amplidyne
- Metadyne
