= Hippolyte Fontaine =

French electrical engineer (1833–1910)

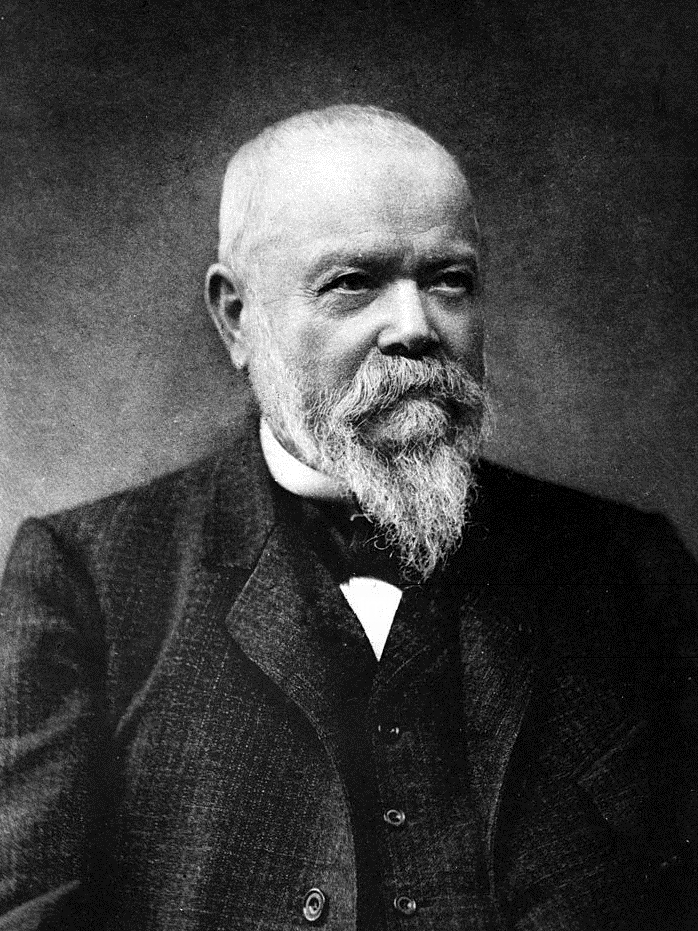
Hippolyte Fontaine

Hippolyte Fontaine (born François-Hypolite Fontaine, 12 April 1833 in Dijon – 17 February 1910 in Hyères) was a French electrical engineer who worked with Zénobe Gramme on the development of the Gramme machine (the first industrially viable electrical generator), and whose contributions were essential to the creation of the dynamo. He was the first to transmit electricity via electrical wires.

During the Franco-Prussian War of 1870–1871, Fontaine managed the production of cannons in Paris. Colleagues he met in this position recommended him to Zenobe Gramme, and in 1871, Fontaine was hired to administer the newly established Société des Machines magnéto-électriques Gramme, a corporation dedicated to the development of the Gramme machine. In this role, he accompanied Gramme to the Weltausstellung 1873 Wien, where he demonstrated the reversibility of the electrical generator and the transmission of electricity over a two-kilometre distance via copper wiring.

In 1881, he helped organize the Exposition internationale d'Électricité in Paris, which hosted the first international congress of electricians; in response, the French government inducted him into the Légion d'honneur.

He is buried in Cimetière du Montparnasse.
