= Antoine Breguet =

French physicist

- Born: January 26, 1851; Ancien 11e arrondissement de Paris
- Died: July 8, 1882; 1st arrondissement of Paris

Antoine Breguet (born in Paris on January 26, 1851 and died in Paris 1st on July 8, 1882), was a French physicist, the great-grandson of the watchmaker and physicist Abraham Breguet, son of physicist Louis Clément François Breguet (1804-1883), and father of aviation pioneers Louis Charles Breguet (1880-1955) and Jacques Eugène Henri Breguet (1881-1939). His daughter Madeleine Camille Breguet (1878-1900) married Jacques Bizet (1872-1922), son of composer Georges Bizet, in 1898 but died prematurely without descendants at the age of 21.

== Biography ==
In 1870, while still a student, Antoine Breguet was employed in the battalion of auxiliary miners of the engineering corps formed by chief mining engineer Eugène Jacquot to participate in the defense of the capital. Two years later, he entered the École Polytechnique, becoming the first member of his family to pursue higher education. After graduating from Polytechnique, he joined the family business.

The company, while maintaining its headquarters at the Quai de l'Horloge, had since 1872 workshops at 81, Boulevard du Montparnasse (6th arrondissement) better suited to its activities, which began to take on an industrial character. Antoine Breguet built the Gramme machine there and signed a treaty with Zénobe Gramme in 1875. He then wrote a book on the theory of the Gramme machine, published in 1880. He constructed experimental and laboratory apparatus: electromagnets, induction coils, capacitors. He invented a recording anemometer powered by electricity in 1875 and a mercury telephone.

In 1881, he transformed the family watchmaking business into a public company under the name "Maison Bréguet" with the purpose of "construction, installation, and trade" of electrical equipment (telegraphy, telephony, signals, lighting, remote power transmission...) and with its headquarters at 37 [sic], Quai de l'Horloge. On December 31 of the same year, Antoine Breguet, described as an "engineer constructor," purchased from his father, in front of a notary, the "business of constructing electrical appliances and precision instruments located at 39, Quai de l'Horloge, for the principal sum of 300000 francs."

At the same time, he launched the construction of new workshops at 19, Rue Didot in the Quartier de Plaisance (14th arrondissement) which he would not live to see completed (1822). Overworked, Antoine Breguet succumbed on July 8, 1882, at his residence at 4, Rue Perrault, to a cardiovascular accident. He was buried in the Père-Lachaise Cemetery (division 11).

He left behind his wife, Marie Dubois, aged 24, with three young children. The Maison Breguet was entrusted to its director, Gaston Sciama, until their majority.

== Honors ==
=== French ===
- Officer of Academy Palms

=== Foreign ===
- Knight of the Order of Leopold (Belgium)
- Commander of the Order of Isabella the Catholic (Spain)
- Knight of the Royal Order of the Polar Star (Sweden)
