= Gramme machine =

Electrical generator that produces direct current

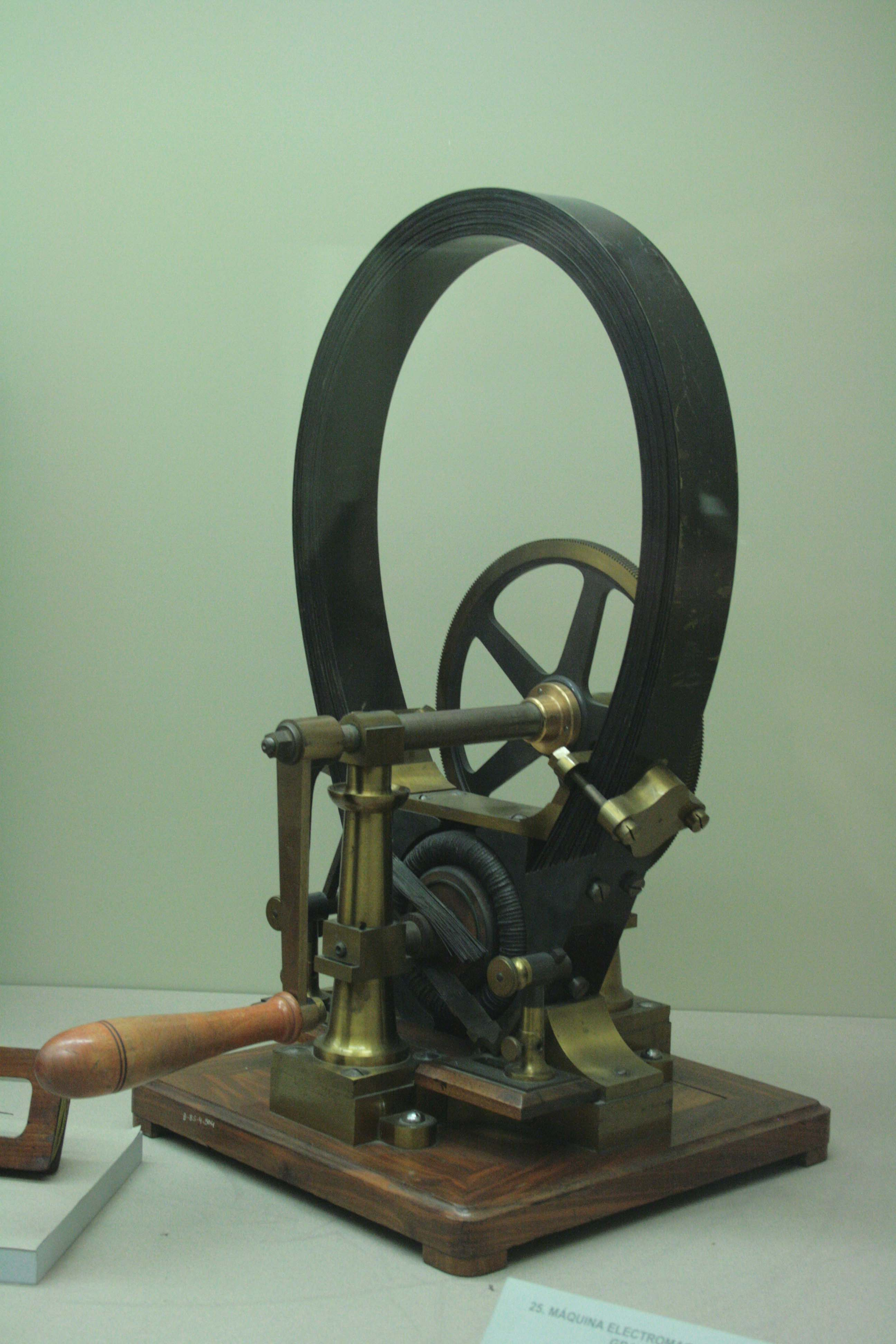
A Gramme machine or Gramme magneto.

A Gramme machine, Gramme ring, Gramme magneto, or Gramme dynamo is an electrical generator that produces direct current, named for its Belgian inventor, Zénobe Gramme, and was built as either a dynamo or a magneto. It was the first generator to produce power on a commercial scale for industry. Inspired by a machine invented by Antonio Pacinotti in 1860, Gramme was the developer of a new induced rotor in form of a wire-wrapped ring (Gramme ring) and demonstrated this apparatus to the Academy of Sciences in Paris in 1871. Although popular in 19th century electrical machines, the Gramme winding principle is no longer used since it makes inefficient use of the conductors. The portion of the winding on the interior of the ring cuts no flux and does not contribute to energy conversion in the machine. The winding requires twice the number of turns and twice the number of commutator bars as an equivalent drum-wound armature.

== Description ==
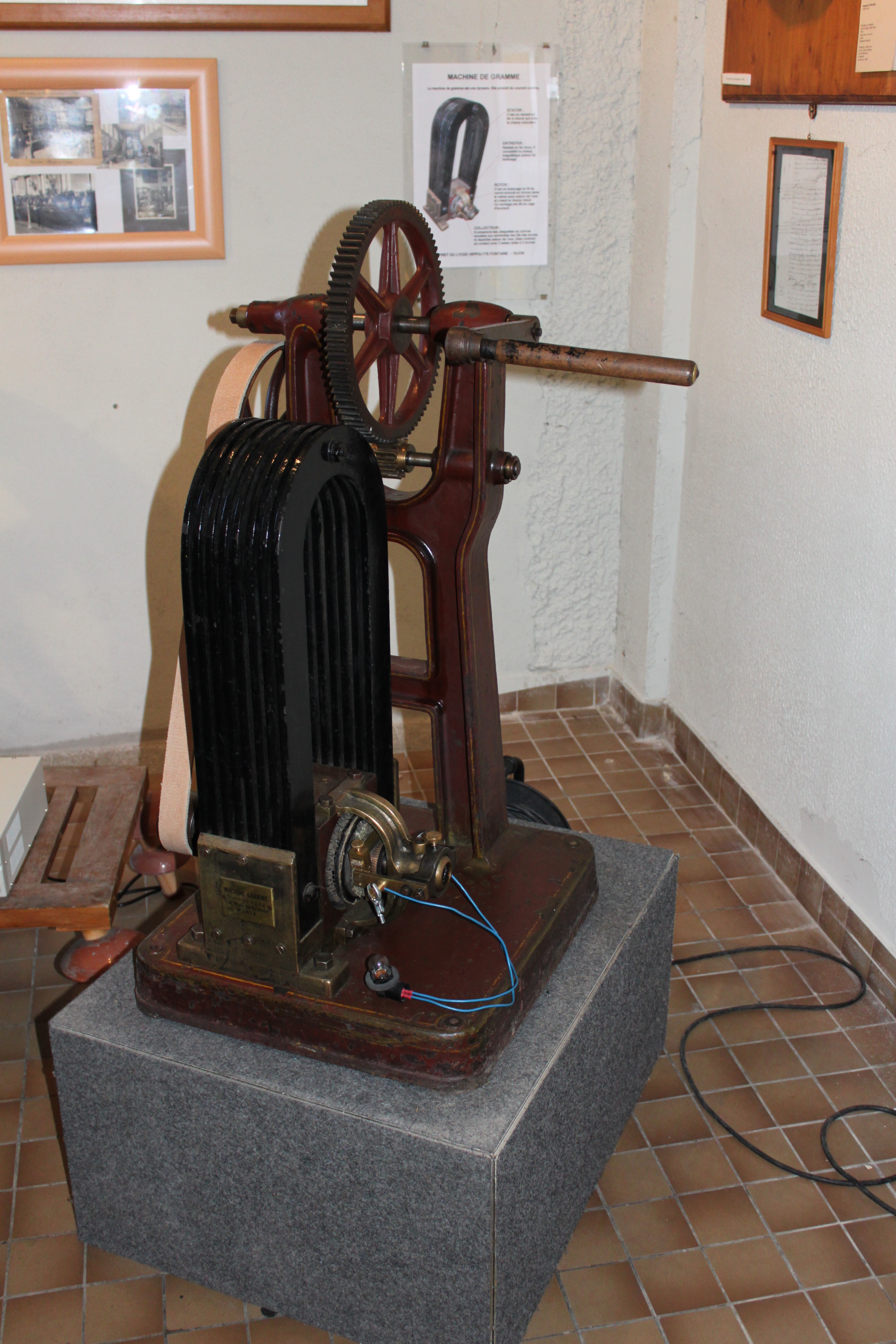
Gramme machine

The Gramme machine used a ring armature, with a series of armature coils, wound around a revolving ring of soft iron. The coils are connected in series, and the junction between each pair is connected to a commutator on which two brushes run. Permanent magnets magnetize the soft iron ring, producing a magnetic field which rotates through the coils in order as the armature turns. This induces a voltage in two of the coils on opposite sides of the armature, which is picked off by the brushes.

Earlier electromagnetic machines passed a magnet near the poles of one or two electromagnets, or rotated coils wound on double-T armatures within a static magnetic field, creating brief spikes or pulses of DC resulting in a transient output of low average power, rather than a constant output of high average power.

With more than a few coils on the Gramme ring armature, the resulting voltage waveform is practically constant, thus producing a near direct current supply. This type of machine needs only electromagnets producing the magnetic field to become a modern generator.

== Invention of modern electric motor ==
During a demonstration at an industrial exposition in Vienna in 1873, Gramme accidentally discovered that this device, if supplied with a constant-voltage power supply, will act as an electric motor. Gramme's partner, Hippolyte Fontaine, carelessly connected the terminals of a Gramme machine to another dynamo which was producing electricity, and its shaft began to spin. The Gramme machine was the first powerful electric motor useful as more than a toy or laboratory curiosity. Today some elements of this design forms the basis of nearly all DC electric motors. Gramme's use of multiple commutator contacts with multiple overlapped coils, and his innovation of using a ring armature, was an improvement on earlier dynamos and helped usher in development of large-scale electrical devices.

Earlier designs of electric motors were notoriously inefficient because they had large, or very large, air gaps throughout much of the rotation of their rotors. Long air gaps create weak forces, resulting in low torque. A device called the St. Louis motor (still available from scientific supply houses), although not intended to, clearly demonstrates this great inefficiency, and seriously misleads students as to how real motors work. These early inefficient designs apparently were based on observing how magnets attracted ferromagnetic materials (such as iron and steel) from some distance away. It took a number of decades in the 19th century for electrical engineers to learn the importance of small air gaps. The Gramme ring, however, has a comparatively small air gap, which enhances its efficiency. (In the top illustration, the large hoop-like piece is the laminated permanent magnet; the Gramme ring is rather hard to see at the base of the hoop.)

== Principle of operation ==
One-pole, one-coil Gramme ring.

This illustration shows a simplified one-pole, one-coil Gramme ring and a graph of the current produced as the ring spins one revolution. While no actual device uses this exact design, this diagram is a building block to better understand the next illustrations.

One-pole, two-coil Gramme ring.

A one-pole, two-coil Gramme ring. The second coil on the opposite side of the ring is wired in parallel with the first. Because the bottom coil is oriented opposite of the top coil, but both are immersed in the same magnetic field, the current forms a ring across the brush terminals.

Two-pole, four-coil Gramme ring.

A two-pole, four-coil Gramme ring. The coils of A and A' sum together, as do the coils of B and B', producing two pulses of power 90° out of phase with each other. When coils A and A' are at maximum output, coils B and B' are at zero output.

Three-pole, six-coil Gramme ring.

A three-pole, six-coil Gramme ring, and a graph of the combined three poles, each 120° out of phase from the other and summing together.

== Drum windings ==
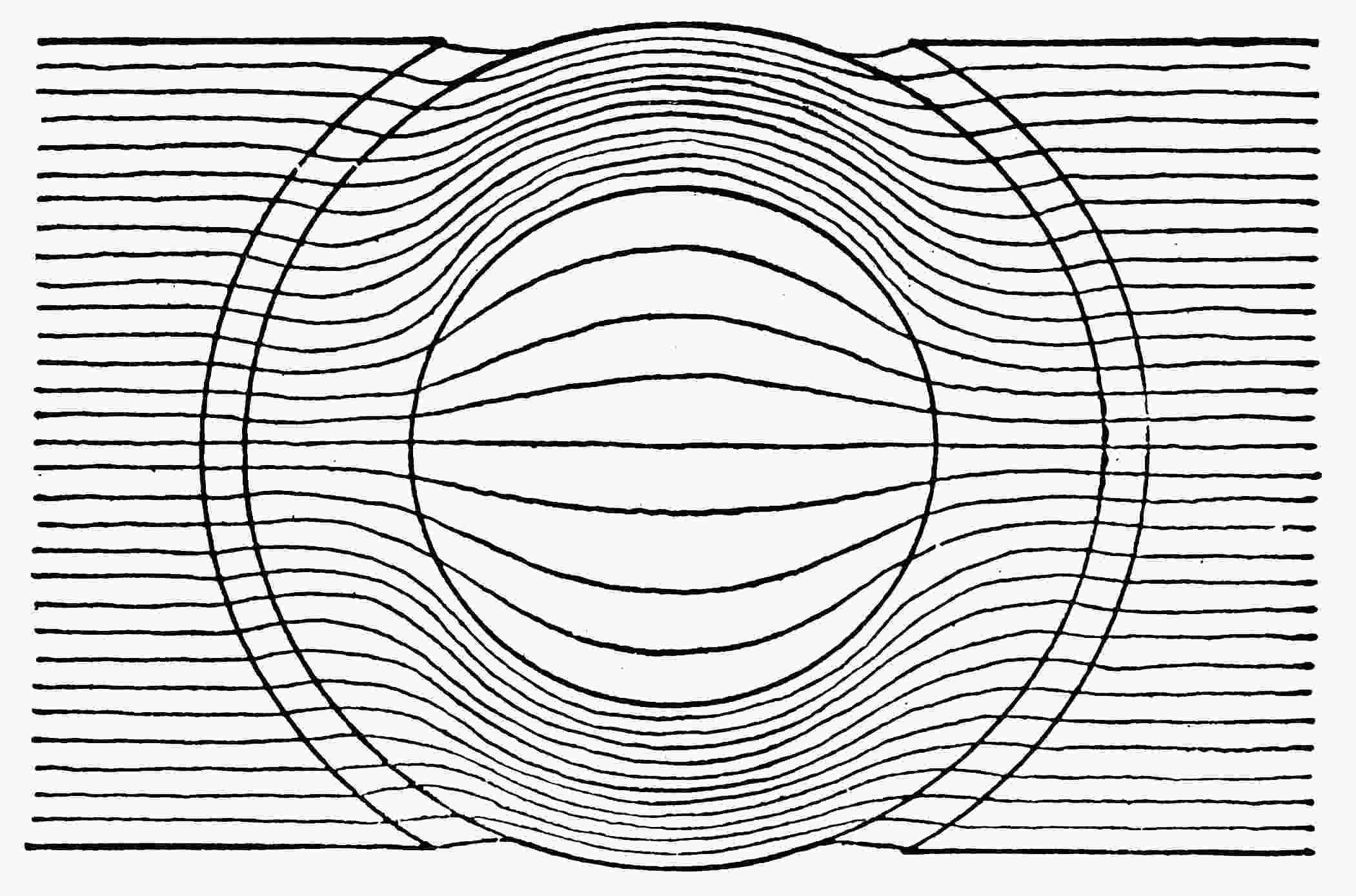
Diagram of magnetic lines through a Gramme ring, showing the very few magnetic lines of force crossing the center gap.

While the Gramme ring permitted a more steady power output, it suffered from a technical design inefficiency due to how magnetic lines of force pass through a ring armature. The field lines tend to concentrate within and follow the surface metal of the ring to the other side, with relatively few lines of force penetrating into the interior of the ring.

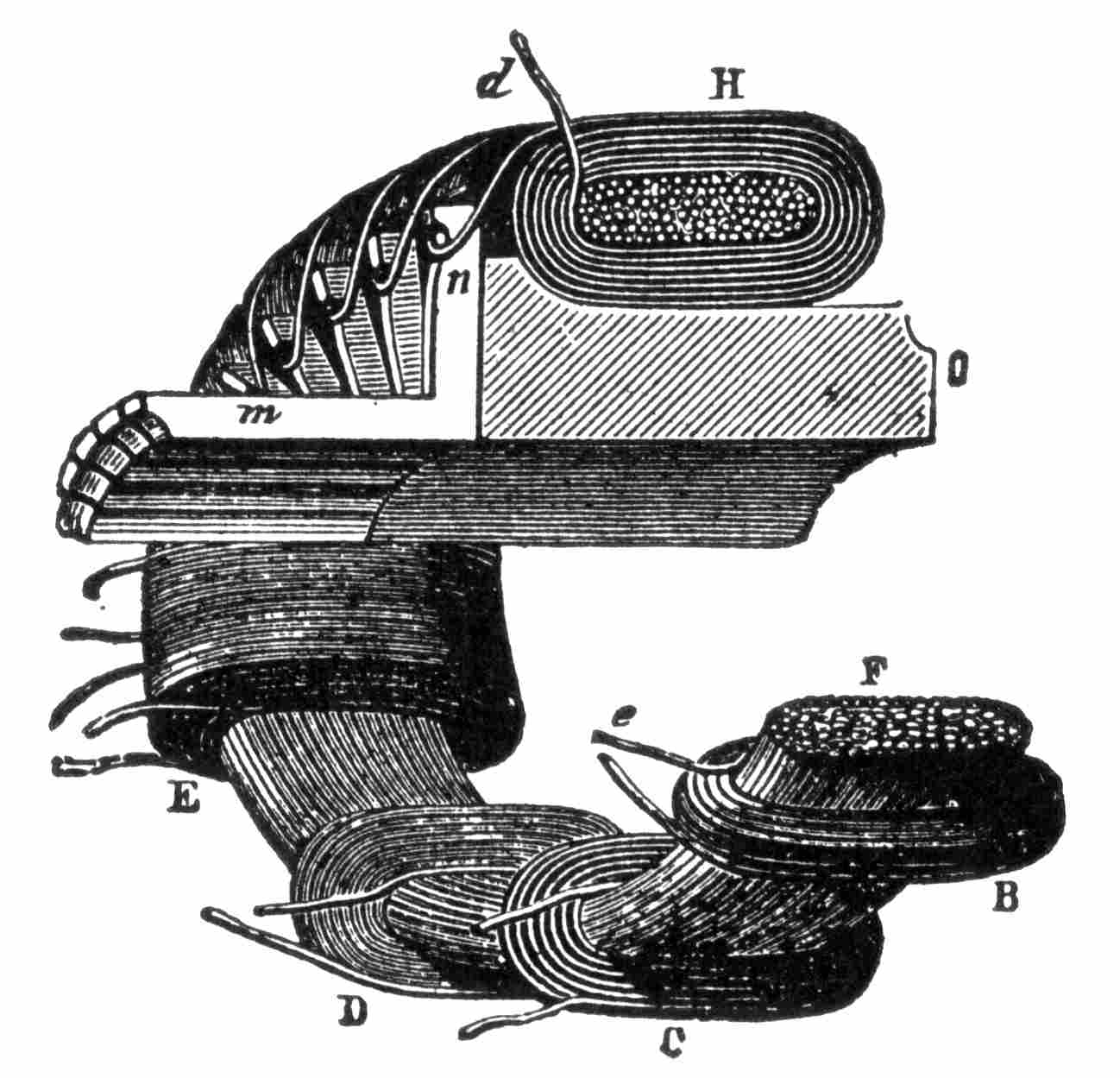
Early form of the Gramme ring armature with coils penetrating the interior of the ring.

Consequently, the interior windings of each small coil are minimally effective at producing power because they cut very few lines of force compared with the windings on the exterior of the ring. The interior windings are effectively dead wire and only add resistance to the circuit, lowering efficiency.

Initial attempts to insert a stationary field coil within the center of the ring to help the lines penetrate into the center proved too complex to engineer. Further, if the lines did penetrate the interior of the ring any e.m.f. produced would have opposed the e.m.f. from the outside of the ring because the wire on the inside was orientated in the opposite direction to that on the outside having turned through 180 degrees as it was wound.

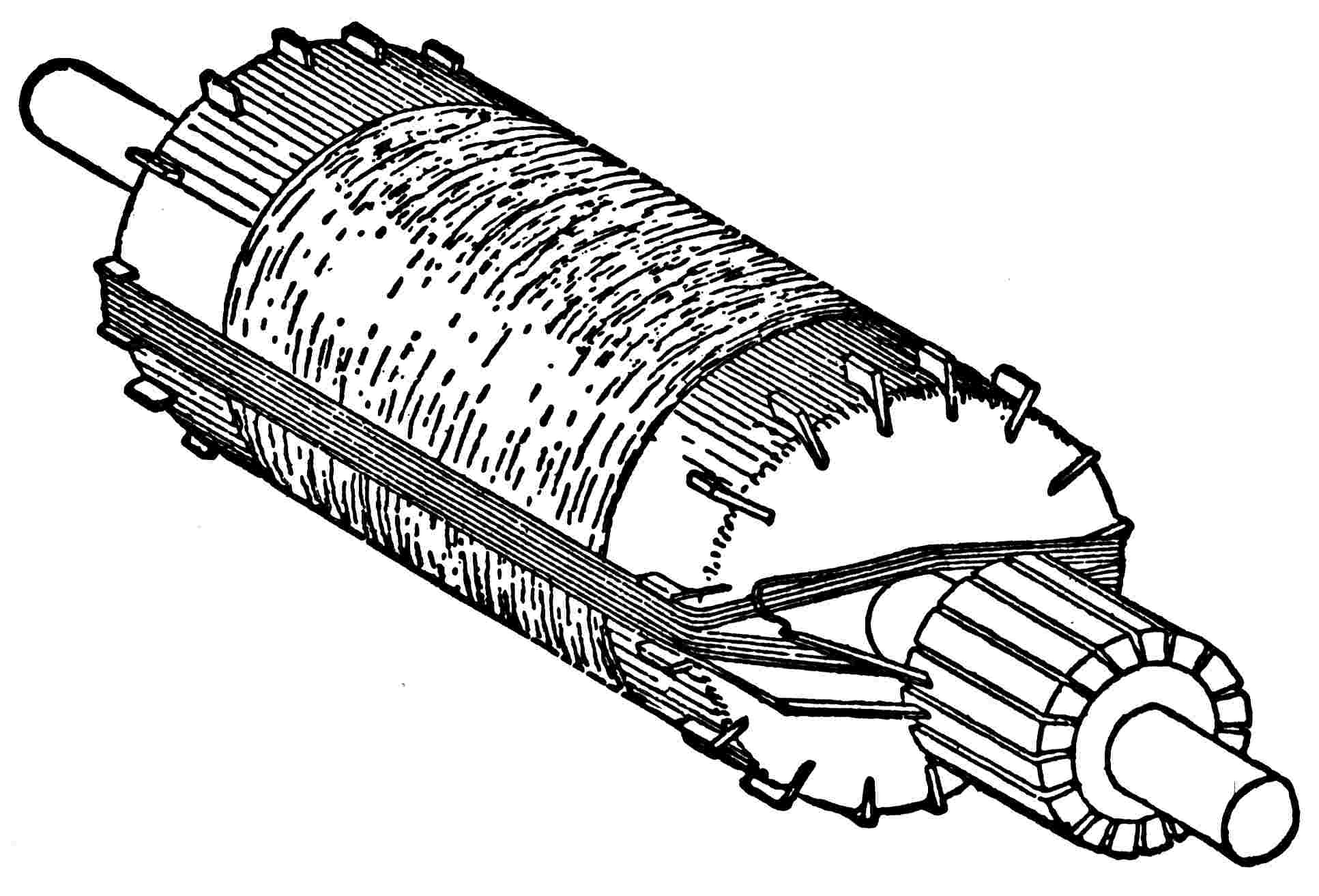
Example of a single winding around the exterior of a drum core with no wires penetrating the interior.

Eventually it was found to be more efficient to wrap a single loop of wire across the exterior of the ring and simply not have any part of the loop pass through the interior. This also reduces construction complexity since one large winding spanning the width of the ring is able to take the place of two smaller windings on opposite sides of the ring. All modern armatures use this externally wrapped (drum) design, although the windings do not extend fully across the diameter; they are more akin to chords of a circle, in geometrical terms. Neighboring windings overlap, as can be seen in almost any modern motor or generator rotor that has a commutator. In addition, windings are placed into slots with a rounded shape (as seen from the end of the rotor). At the surface of the rotor, the slots are only as wide as needed to permit the insulated wire to pass through them while winding the coils.

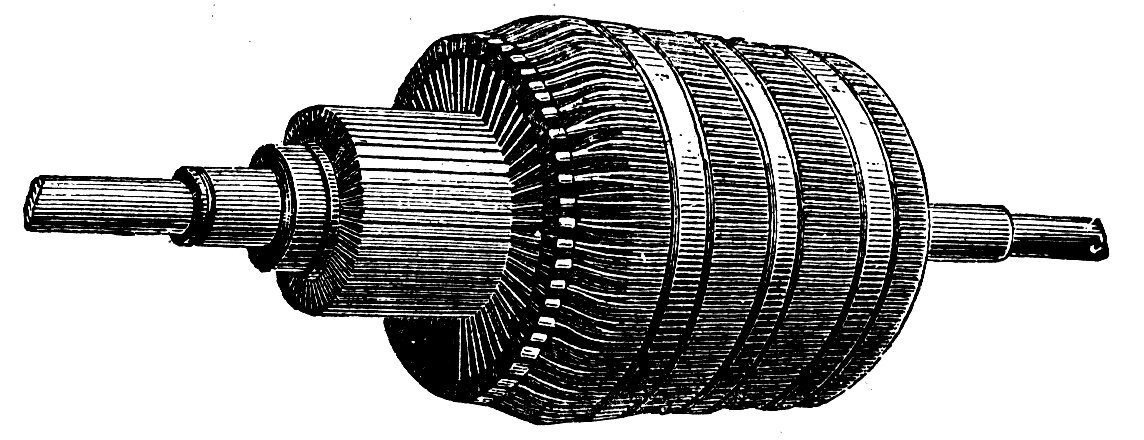
Modern design of the Gramme ring, wrapped only around the exterior of the core.

While the hollow ring could now be replaced with a solid cylindrical core or drum, the ring still proves to be a more efficient design, because in a solid core the field lines concentrate in a thin surface region and minimally penetrate the center. For a very large power-generation armature several feet in diameter, using a hollow ring armature requires far less metal and is lighter than a solid core drum armature. The hollow center of the ring also provides a path for ventilation and cooling in high power applications.

In small armatures a solid drum is often used simply for ease of construction, since the core can be easily formed from a stack of stamped metal disks keyed to lock into a slot on the shaft.

== See also ==
- Electric generator
- Electric motor
- Dynamo
- Alternator
- Rotary converter
- Excitation (magnetic)
- Field coil
- Stator
