= Alternator (automotive) =

Devices in automobiles to charge the battery and power the electrical system

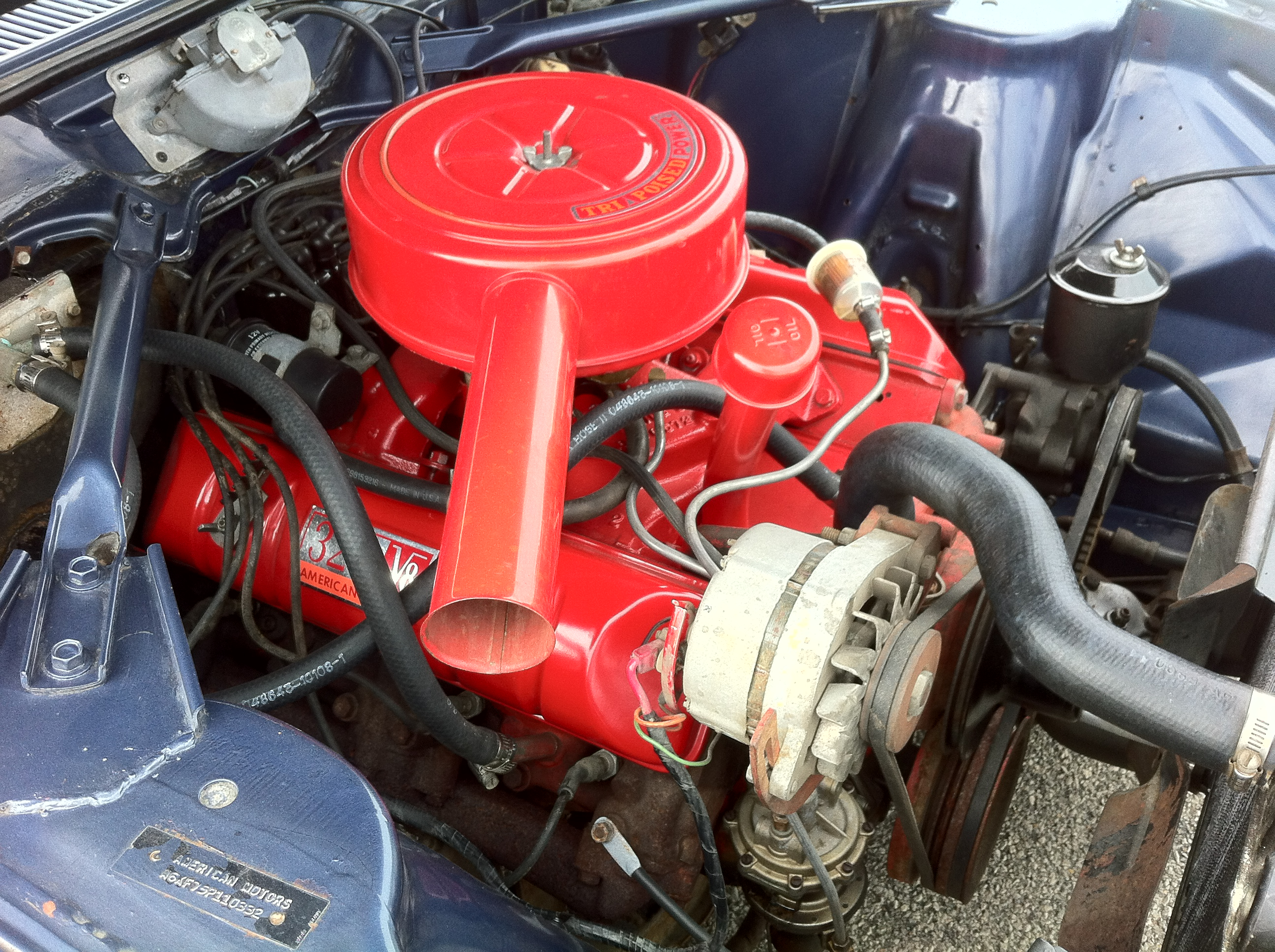
Alternator (silver) mounted on a V8 engine

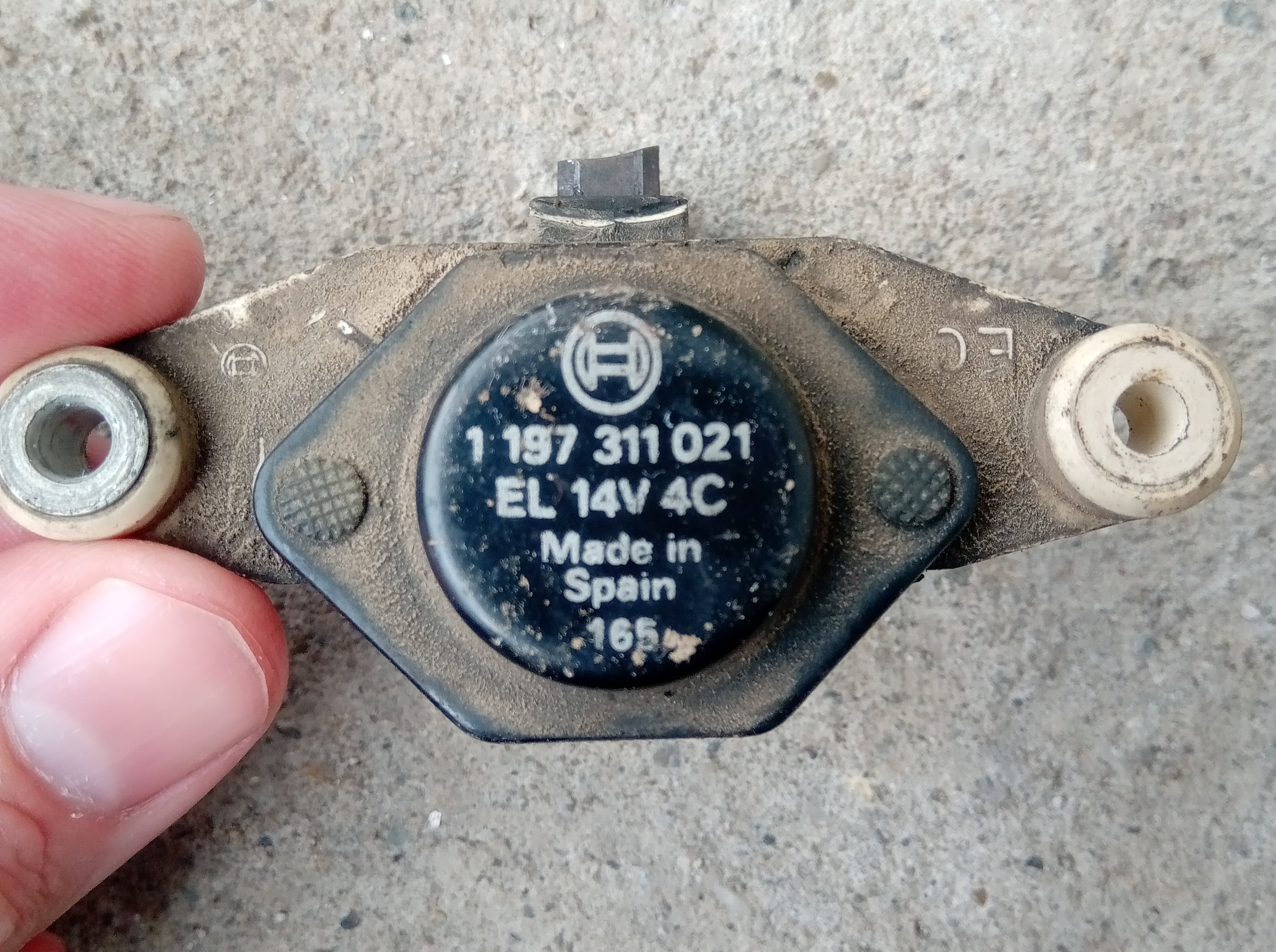
Alternator voltage regulator (brushes are worn out)

An alternator is a type of electric generator used in modern automobiles to charge the battery and to power the electrical system when its engine is running.

Until the 1960s, automobiles used DC dynamo generators with commutators. As silicon-diode rectifiers became widely available and affordable, the alternator gradually replaced the dynamo. This was encouraged by the increasing electrical power required for cars in this period, with increasing loads from larger headlamps, electric wipers, heated rear windows, and other accessories.

== History ==
The modern type of vehicle alternators were first used in military applications during World War II, to power radio equipment on specialist vehicles. (Note: See Fitted For Wireless.) After the war, other vehicles with high electrical demands — such as ambulances and radio taxis — could also be fitted with optional alternators.

Alternators were first introduced as standard equipment on a production car by the Chrysler Corporation on the Valiant in 1960, several years ahead of Ford and General Motors.

=== Magnetos in early automobiles ===
Some early automobiles, like the Ford Model T, used a different sort of charging system: an engine-driven magneto which generated low-voltage alternating current that was supplied to trembler coils, which provided the high voltage needed to generate ignition sparks. (This was different from a true ignition magneto, which generates high voltage directly.) Since such a magneto system depended only on the engine's motion to generate current, it could be used even when starting a manually cranked engine, provided the crank was pulled sharply, so that the magneto would produce enough current for the coils to make good sparks.

The Model T incorporated its magneto into the engine flywheel. The first Model Ts used the magneto solely for the trembler coil ignition. Beginning with the 1915 model year, Ford added electric headlights, also powered by the magneto. The magneto circuit was strictly AC, with no battery included. (There was a switch on the ignition coils to use a battery instead, which could be helpful when starting in cold weather, but Ford neither provided a battery nor encouraged the use of one before it introduced an electric starter in 1919. Owners would have to install the battery themselves and charge it externally.)

Starting in the 1919 model year, Ford upgraded the Model T to include an electric starter, which was standard for some models and optional for others. This starter installation also included a battery, charged by a conventional dynamo, and the lights were now powered by the battery. However, the flywheel magneto still powered the ignition, and since models without the starter had no battery, they continued to use magneto-powered lights.

== Advantages over dynamos ==
Alternators have several advantages over direct-current generators (dynamos). Alternators are:

- Lighter, cheaper, more rugged, faster to replace (under one hour)
- Can provide useful charge at idle speed
- Use slip rings, having greatly extended brush life over a commutator (or completely brushless designs)
- The brushes in an alternator carry only direct current (DC) excitation current, which is a small fraction of the current carried by the brushes of a DC generator, which carry the generator's entire output

A set of rectifiers (diode bridge) is required to convert alternating current (AC) to DC. To provide direct current with low ripple, a polyphase winding is used and the pole-pieces of the rotor are shaped (claw-pole). Automotive alternators are usually belt-driven at 2–3 times crankshaft speed, speeds that could cause a commutator to fly apart in a generator. The alternator runs at various RPM (which varies the frequency) since it is driven by the engine, regardless of direction of rotation. This is not a problem because the alternating current is rectified to DC.

Alternator regulators are also simpler than those for generators. Generator regulators require a cutout relay to isolate the output coils (the armature) from the battery at low speed; that isolation is provided by the alternator rectifier diodes. Also, most generator regulators include a current limiter; alternators are inherently current-limited.

== Operation ==
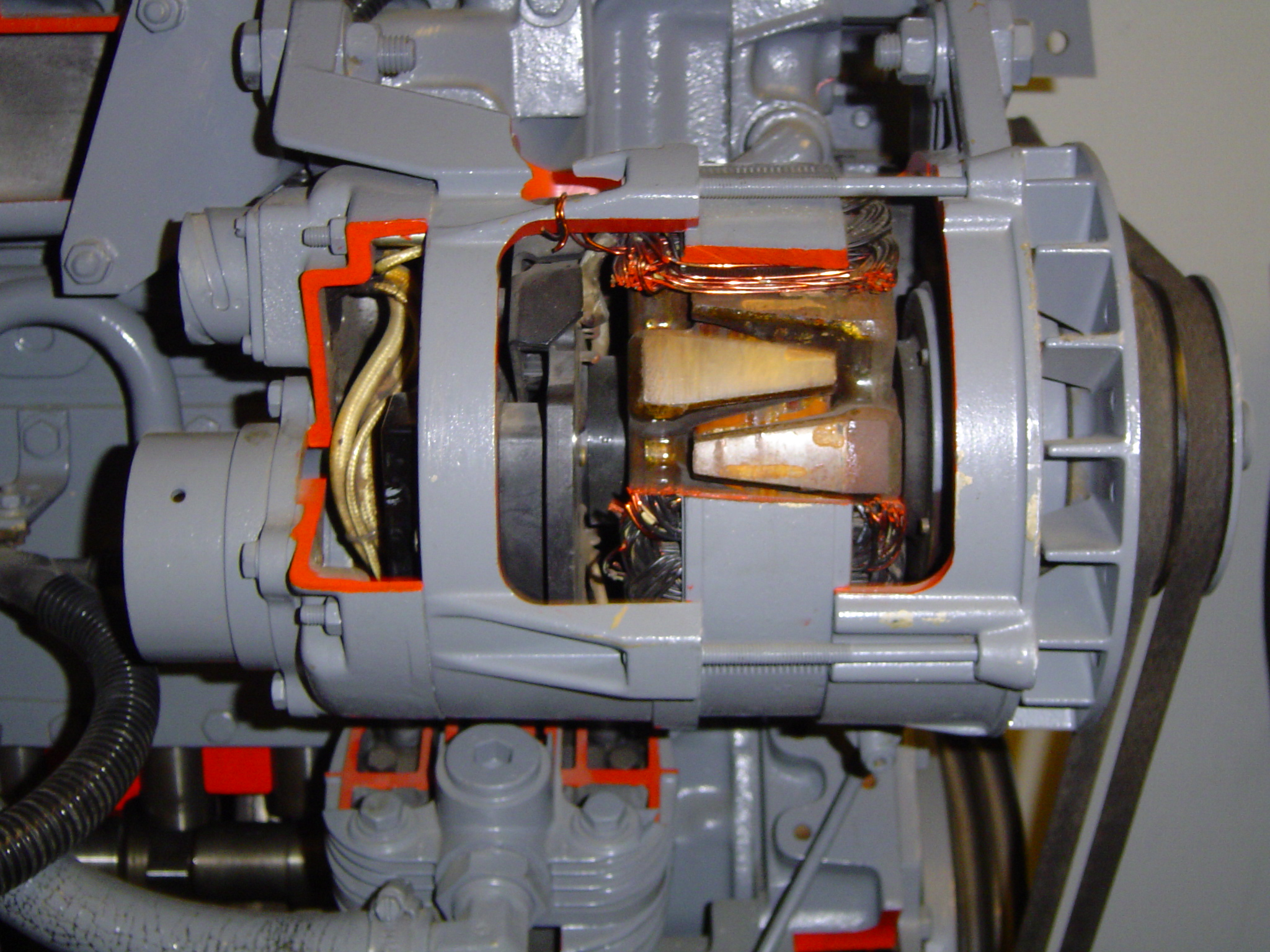
Cut-away of an alternator, showing the claw-pole construction; two of the wedge-shaped field poles, alternating N and S, are visible in the centre and the stationary armature winding is visible at the top and bottom of the opening. The belt and pulley at the right-hand end drives the alternator.

The claw pole design produces an AC waveform that is more efficiently rectified than a sine wave.

Despite their names, both 'DC generators' (or 'dynamos') and 'alternators' initially produce alternating current. In a so-called 'DC generator', this AC current is generated in the rotating armature, and then converted to DC by the commutator and brushes. In an 'alternator', the AC current is generated in the stationary stator, and then is converted to DC by the rectifiers (diodes).

Typical passenger vehicle and light truck alternators use Lundahl or 'claw-pole' field construction. This uses a shaped iron core on the rotor to produce a multi-pole field from a single coil winding. The poles of the rotor look like fingers of two hands interlocked with each other. The coil is mounted axially inside this and field current is supplied by slip rings and carbon brushes. These alternators have their field and stator windings cooled by axial airflow, produced by an external fan attached to the drive belt pulley.

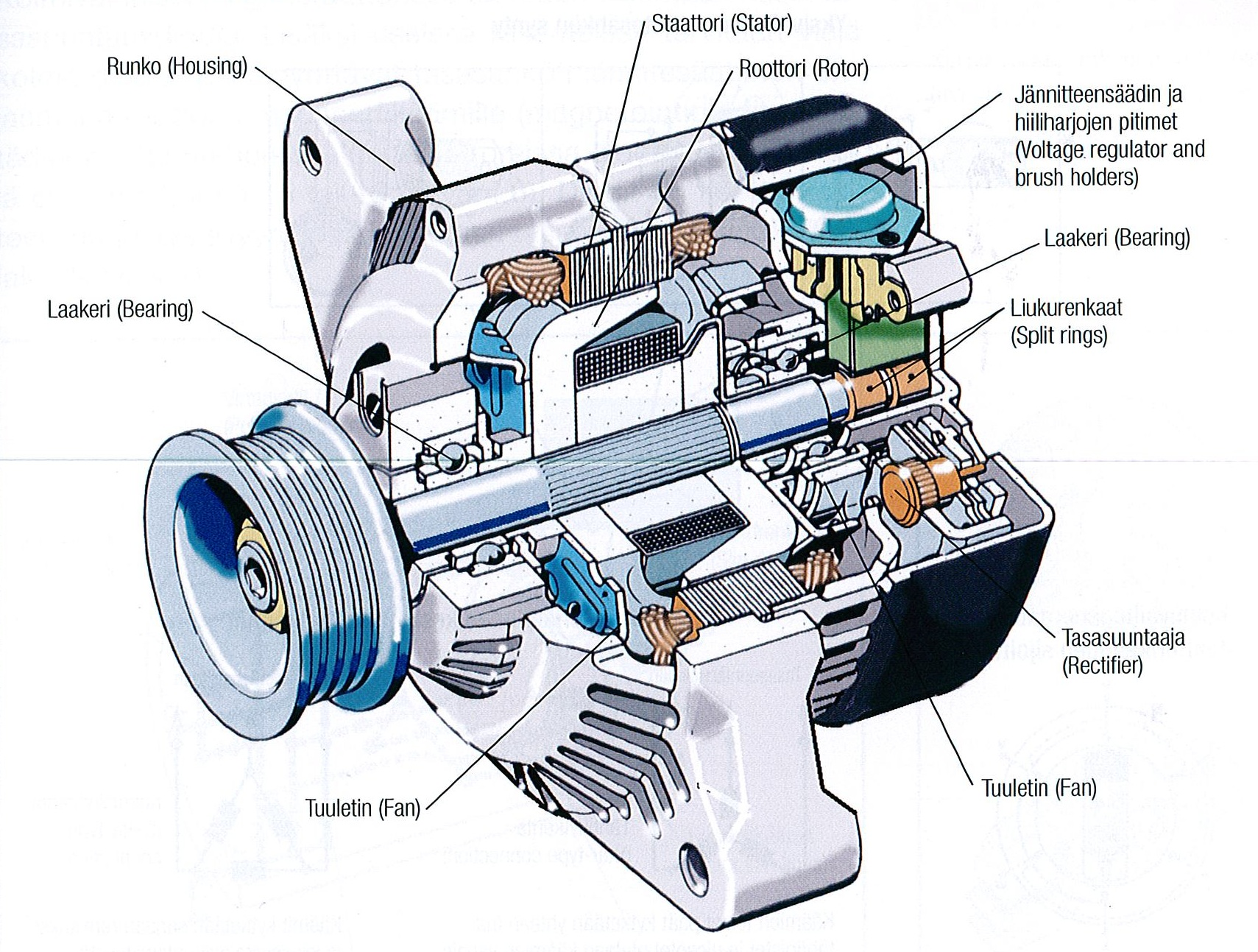
Automotive alternator

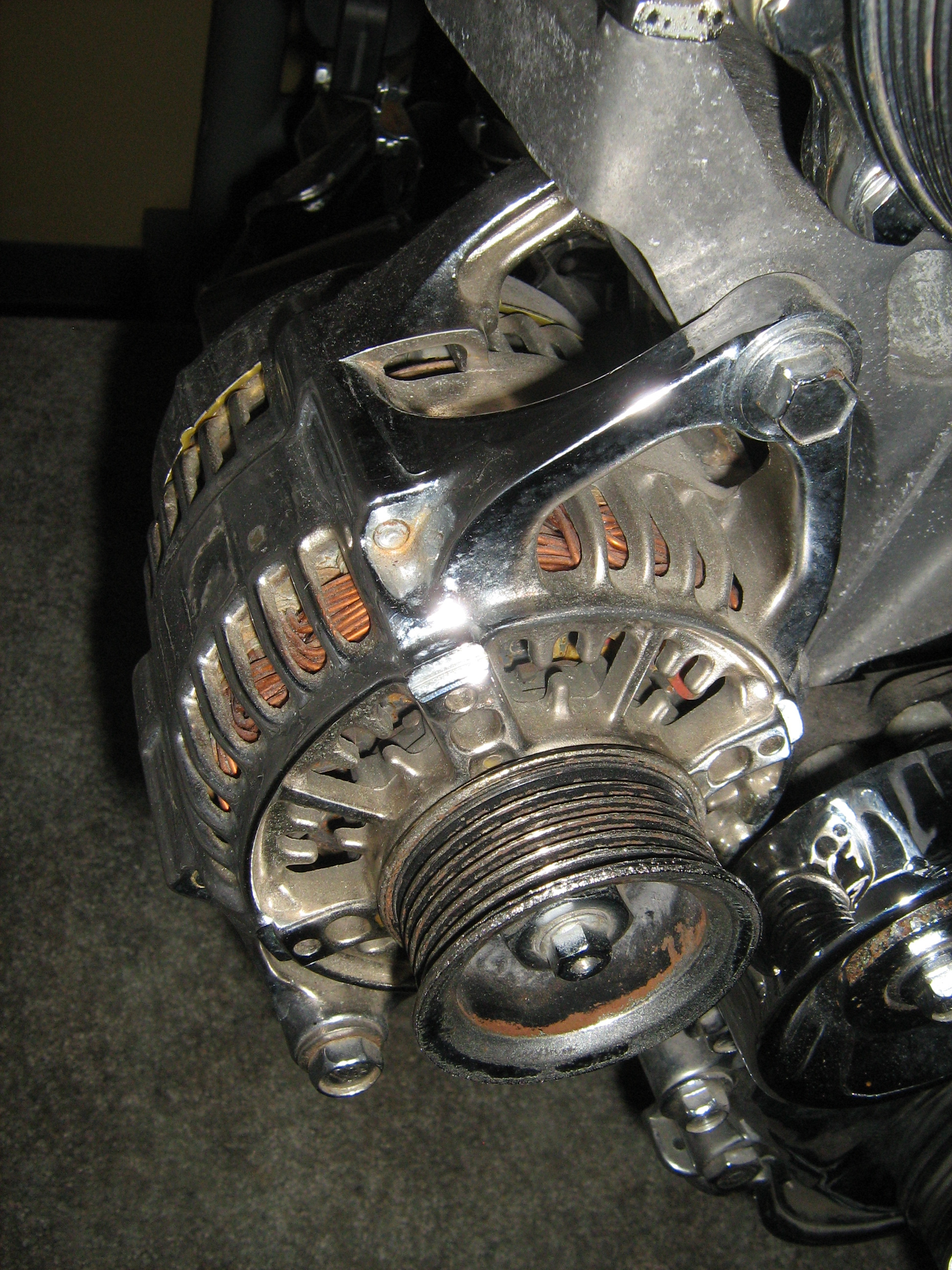
Compact alternator

Modern vehicles now use the compact alternator layout. This is electrically and magnetically similar, but has improved air cooling. Better cooling permits more power from a smaller machine. The casing has distinctive radial vent slots at each end and now encloses the fan. Two fans are used, one at each end, and the airflow is semi-radial, entering axially and leaving radially outwards. The stator windings now consist of a dense central band where the iron core and copper windings are tightly packed, and end bands where the windings are more exposed for better heat transfer. The closer core spacing from the rotor improves magnetic efficiency. The smaller, enclosed fans produce less noise, particularly at higher machine speeds.

Alternators can also be water-cooled in cars.

Larger vehicles may have field coil alternators similar to larger machines.

The windings of a 3 phase alternator may be connected using either the delta or star (wye) connection regime set-up.

Brushless versions of these type alternators are also common in larger machinery such as highway trucks and earthmoving machinery. With two oversized shaft bearings as the only wearing parts, these can provide extremely long and reliable service, even exceeding the engine overhaul intervals.

== Field regulation ==
Automotive alternators require a voltage regulator which operates by modulating the small field current to produce a constant voltage at the battery terminals. Early designs (c.1960s–1970s) used a discrete device mounted elsewhere in the vehicle. Intermediate designs (c.1970s–1990s) incorporated the voltage regulator into the alternator housing. Modern designs do away with the voltage regulator altogether; voltage regulation is now a function of the engine control unit (ECU). The field current is much smaller than the output current of the alternator; for example, a 70 A alternator may need only 2-3 A of field current. The field current is supplied to the rotor windings by slip rings. The low current and relatively smooth slip rings ensure greater reliability and longer life than that obtained by a DC generator with its commutator and higher current being passed through its brushes.

The field windings are supplied with power from the battery via the ignition switch and regulator. A parallel circuit supplies the "charge" warning indicator and is earthed via the regulator (which is why the indicator is on when the ignition is on but the engine is not running). Once the engine is running and the alternator is generating power, a diode feeds the field current from the alternator main output equalizing the voltage across the warning indicator which goes off. The wire supplying the field current is often referred to as the "exciter" wire. The drawback of this arrangement is that if the warning lamp burns out or the "exciter" wire is disconnected, no current reaches the field windings and the alternator will not generate power. Some warning indicator circuits are equipped with a resistor in parallel with the lamp that permit excitation current to flow if the warning lamp burns out. The driver should check that the warning indicator is on when the engine is stopped; otherwise, there might not be any indication of a failure of the belt which may also drive the cooling water pump. Some alternators will self-excite when the engine reaches a certain speed.

In recent years, alternator regulators are linked to the vehicle's computer system and various factors including air temperature obtained from the intake air temperature sensor, battery temperature sensor and engine load are evaluated in adjusting the voltage supplied by the alternator.

== Output current ==
Older automobiles with minimal lighting may have had an alternator capable of producing only 30 amperes. Typical passenger car and light truck alternators are rated around 50–70 A, though higher ratings are becoming more common, especially as there is more load on the vehicle's electrical system with air conditioning, electric power steering and other electrical systems. Very large alternators used on buses, heavy equipment or emergency vehicles may produce 300 A. Semi-trucks usually have alternators which output 140 A. Very large alternators may be water-cooled or oil-cooled.

== Efficiency ==
Efficiency of automotive alternators is limited by fan cooling loss, bearing loss, iron loss, copper loss, and the voltage drop in the diode bridges. Efficiency reduces dramatically at high speeds mainly due to fan resistance. At medium speeds efficiency of today's alternators is 70–80%. This betters very small high-performance permanent magnet alternators, such as those used for bicycle lighting systems, which achieve an efficiency around 60%. Larger permanent magnet electric machines (that can operate as motors or alternators) can achieve today much higher efficiencies. Pellegrino et al., for instance, propose not particularly expensive designs that show ample regions in which efficiency is above 96%. Large AC generators used in power stations run at carefully controlled speeds and have no constraints on size or weight. They have very high efficiencies as high as 98%.

== Hybrid vehicles ==
Hybrid electric vehicles replace the separate alternator and starter motor with one or more combined motor/generator(s) that start the internal combustion engine, provide some or all of the mechanical power to the wheels, and charge a large storage battery. When more than one motor/generator is present, as in the Hybrid Synergy Drive used in the Toyota Prius and others, one may operate as a generator and feed the other as a motor, providing an electromechanical path for some of the engine power to flow to the wheels. These motor/generators have considerably more powerful electronic devices for their control than the automotive alternator described above.

== See also ==
- Auxiliary power unit (APU)
- Automotive battery
