= Shunt generator =

Electric generator that powers its own field winding

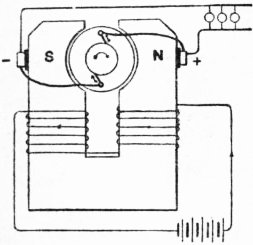
Generator separately excited by battery

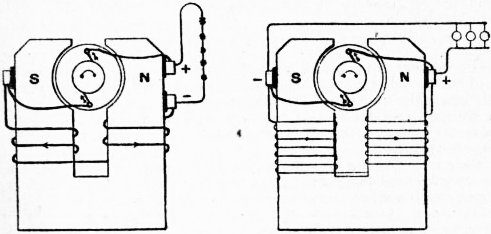
Self exciting generators Series on left, shunt on right

A shunt generator is a type of electric generator in which field winding and armature winding are connected in parallel, and in which the armature supplies both the load current and the field current for the excitation (generator is therefore self excited).

== Generator field connections ==
A shunt field (and any series resistor used for adjustment) may be directly connected across the armature terminals in parallel with the load. Where the machine has a series compounding winding, the field may be connected at the armature side (short shunt) or load side (long shunt). The different connections give different voltage regulation characteristics on load. So as it is connected in shunt it has constant characteristics.

== Characteristic ==
Current in the field windings of a shunt-wound generator is (approximately) independent of the load current, because currents in parallel branches are independent of each other. Since field current, and therefore field strength, is little affected by load current, the output voltage remains more nearly constant than does the output voltage of a series-wound generator.

There will be a small armature voltage drop on the load, which will be reflected in the voltage applied to the shunt field. The output voltage in a DC shunt-wound generator drops slightly as load current increases because of the voltage drop across the armature resistance.

== Usage ==
Self-energizing shunt generators were widely used on automobiles after the decline in usage of third-brush generators c. 1940 but before the proliferation of alternators in the 1960's. Shunt generators are always used with regulators that regulate overvoltage and overcurrent, and disconnect the generator at undervoltage.

== Compound winding ==
In a shunt-wound generator, output voltage varies inversely with load current. In a series-wound generator, output voltage varies directly with load current. A combination of the two types can overcome the disadvantages of both. This combination of windings is called a compound-wound dc generator.

== See also ==
- DC motor
- Homopolar generator
- Excitation (magnetic)
