= Institut Gramme =

Coordinates: 50°37′06.98″N 5°35′13.97″E

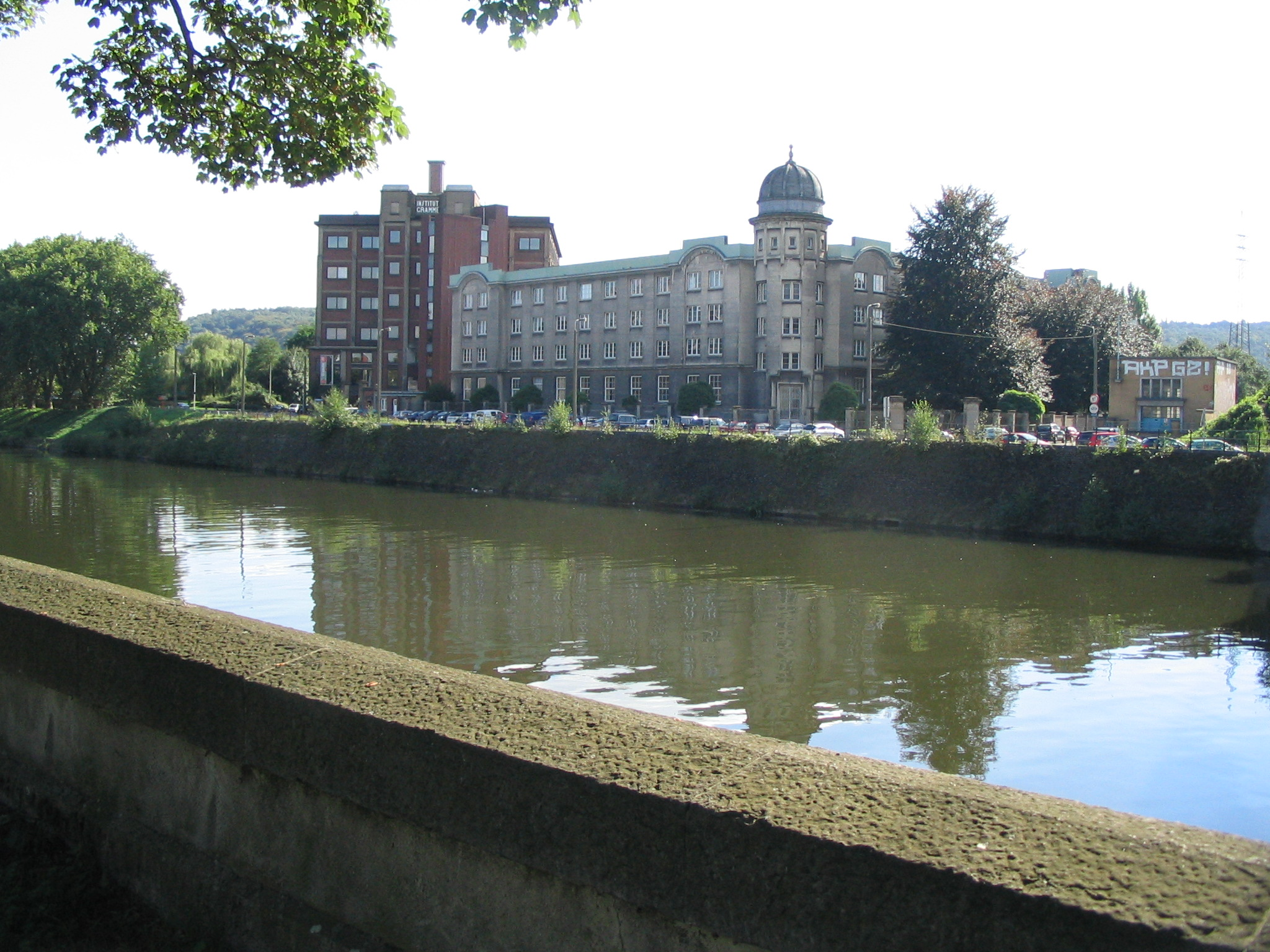
The Insitut Gramme Liège

The Gramme Institute is a graduate school of engineering part of Haute École HELMo in Liège in Belgium.

It was founded in 1906 by Belgian Jesuit Adolphe Renard. It was named "Ecole des Arts et Métiers" after the same school in France. The first promotion came out in 1908 at a time when the studies lasted for 2 years only. The school's mission is the training of highly skilled engineers able to work in all branches of industry. The course period was raised quickly to 3 years and the academic grade of technical engineer was created in 1919. In 1977, the academic grade of industrial engineer was created and studies, now at university level, had a 4-year term. In his hundredth anniversary, recently, the institute has registered its formation in the framework of the Bologna decree granting titles of Bachelor of Science (BS) and Master of Science (MS) degrees at the end of a course period of 5 years.

Programmes:

- "B.S. - Bachelor of Science in Technology & Industrial Science";
- "M.S. - Master of Science in Industrial engineering" - Industry & technological management;
- "M.S. - Master of Science in Industrial engineering" - Sustainable & energetical engineering;
- Double degree HEC Liège - Gramme (from September 2016): M.S. (180 crédits ECTS) - Masters of Science in Industrial & Business engineering.

The school has its own research center, the CRIG, it is named after the inventor of the dynamo, Zenobe Gramme and is part of the ASJEL (Association of higher education institutions in Europe and Lebanon).

The alumni are grouped within the association Union Gramme.

== See also ==
- List of Jesuit sites in Belgium
- Diocese of Liège
