= Zénobe Gramme =

Belgian electrical engineer (1826–1901)

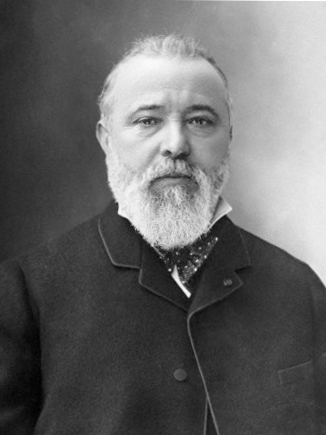
- Zénobe Gramme by Nadar, 1893
- Born: 4 April 1826; Jehay-Bodegnée, Belgium
- Died: 20 January 1901 (aged 74); Bois-Colombes, France
- Resting place: Père Lachaise Cemetery
- Occupation: electrical engineer
- Known for: Gramme dynamo
- Awards: Volta Prize (1888)

Zénobe Théophile Gramme (French pronunciation: [zenɔb teɔfil ɡʁam]; 4 April 1826 – 20 January 1901) was a Belgian electrical engineer. He was born at Jehay-Bodegnée on 4 April 1826, the sixth child of Mathieu-Joseph Gramme, and died at Bois-Colombes on 20 January 1901. He invented the Gramme machine, a type of direct current dynamo capable of generating smoother (less AC) and much higher voltages than the dynamos known to that point.

== Career ==
Gramme was poorly educated and semi-literate throughout his life. His talent was in handicraft and when he left school he became a joiner. After moving to Paris he took a job as a model maker at a company that manufactured electrical equipment and there became interested in technology.

Having built an improved dynamo, Gramme, in association with Hippolyte Fontaine, opened a factory to develop the device. The business, called Société des Machines Magnéto-Électriques Gramme, manufactured the Gramme dynamo, Gramme ring, Gramme armature and other devices. In 1873 a Gramme dynamo was exhibited at the Vienna exhibition.

He was made an officer of the National Order of the Legion of Honour in 1877. In 1888 he was awarded the last of the valuable Volta Prizes by the French government.

== Gramme machine as motor ==
In 1873 he and Hippolyte Fontaine accidentally discovered that the device was reversible and would spin when connected to any DC power supply. The Gramme machine was the first usefully powerful electrical motor that was successful industrially. Before Gramme's inventions, electric motors attained only low power and were mainly used as toys or laboratory curiosities.

In 1875, Nikola Tesla observed a Gramme machine at the Graz University of Technology. He conceived the idea of using it for alternating current but was unable to develop the idea at this time.

== Family ==
In 1857 he married Hortense Nysten who was a widow and mother of a daughter, Héloïse. Hortense died in 1890.

On 17 August 1891 he married Antonie Schentur in Bois-Colombes.

== Death and tributes ==
Gramme died at Bois-Colombes, France, on 20 January 1901 and was buried in Père Lachaise Cemetery.

In the town where his second wife grew up and that Gramme visited every year for a few months, he donated the construction of an avenue to cool the underground water pipe built in 1898. It was named Gramme-Allee in 1902.

In the city of Liège there is a graduate school of engineering, l'Institut Gramme, named after him.

In 2005 he ended up at the 23rd place in the election of Le plus grand Belge (The Greatest Belgian), the television show broadcast by the French-speaking RTBF and based on the BBC show 100 Greatest Britons.

A958 Zenobe Gramme, (1961–), a sailing ship of the Belgian Navy used for training, is named after him.

== Honours ==
- Commander in the Order of Leopold.
- Officer in the Legion of Honour.
- 1888 Volta Prize

== Picture gallery ==
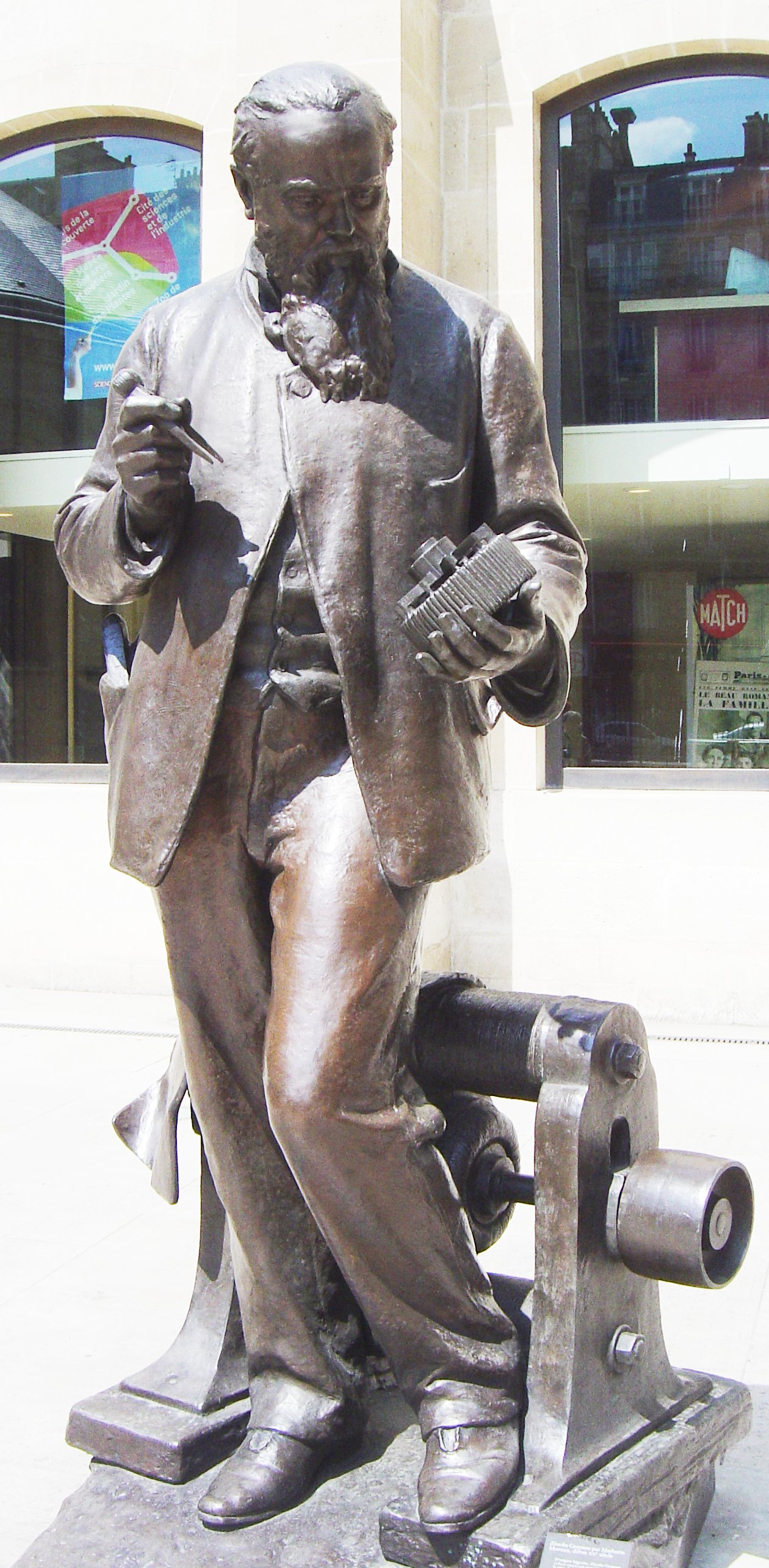
Zénobe Gramme, by Mathurin Moreau

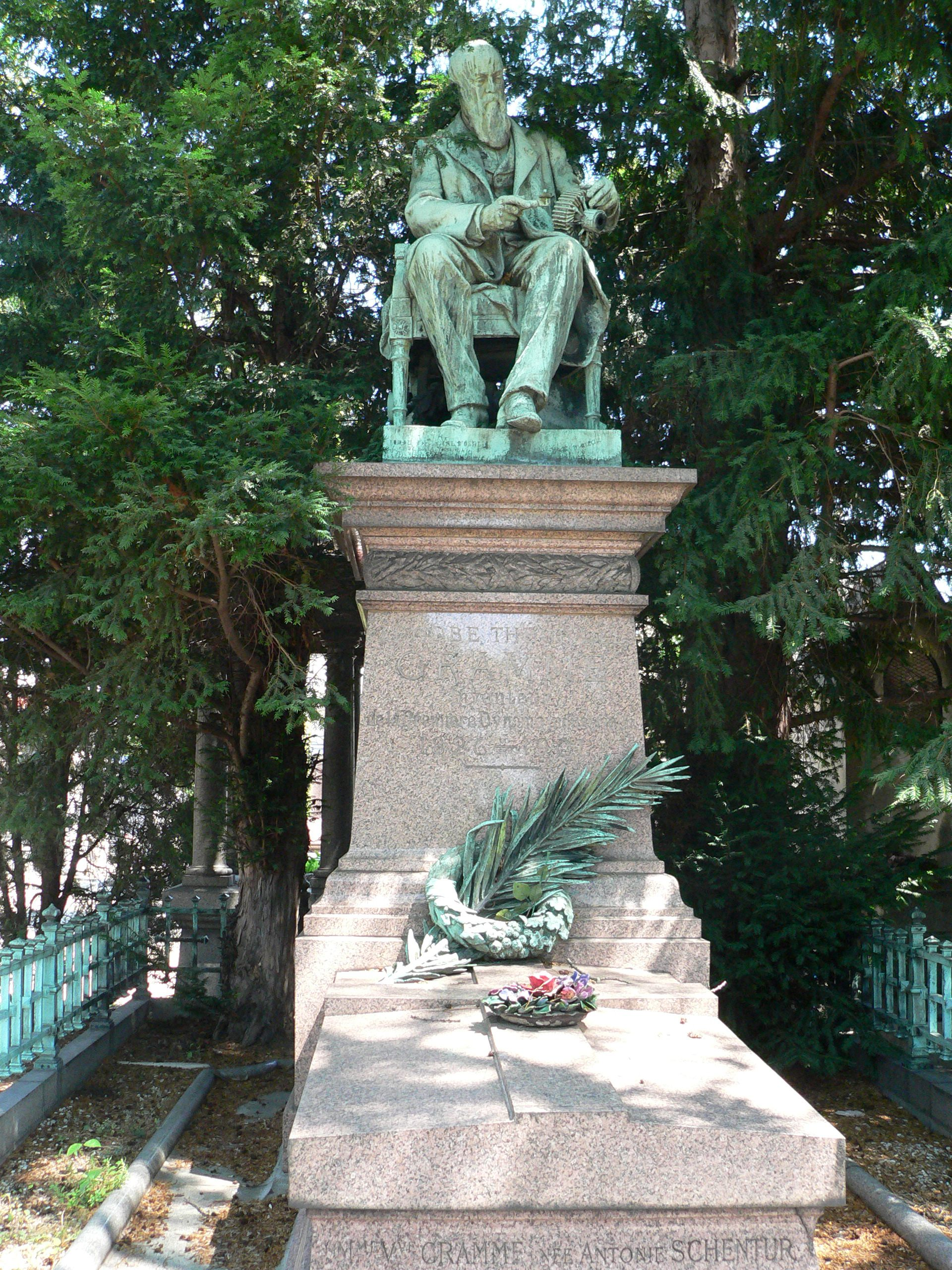
Grave at Cemetery Père-Lachaise

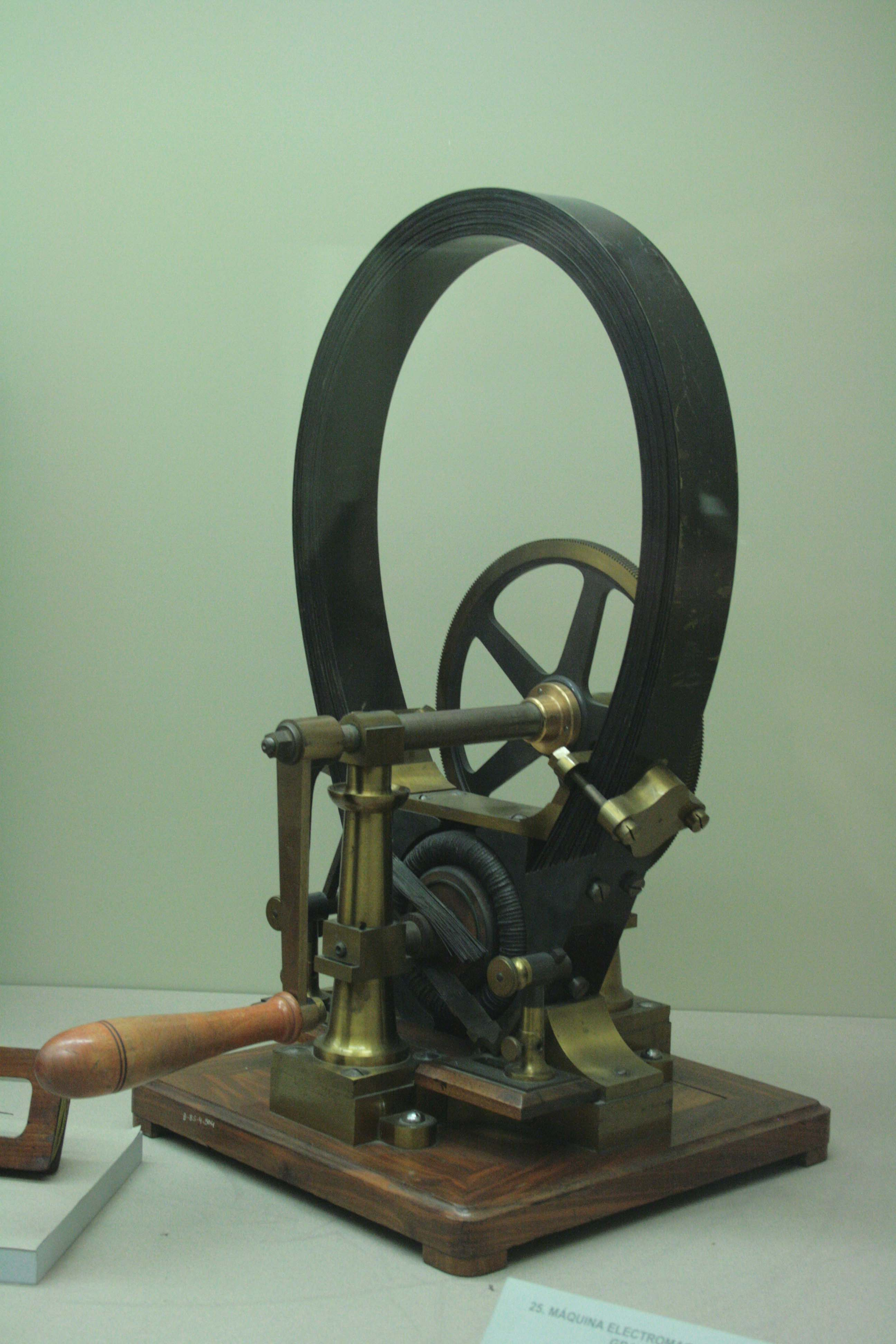
Gramme machine

== See also ==
- Antonio Pacinotti
