= Excitation (magnetic) =

Generation of a magnetic field by an electric current

In electromagnetism, excitation is the process of generating a magnetic field by means of an electric current.

An electric generator or electric motor consists of a rotor spinning in a magnetic field. The magnetic field may be produced by permanent magnets or by field coils. In the case of a machine with field coils, a current must flow in the coils to generate (excite) the field, otherwise no power is transferred to or from the rotor. Field coils yield the most flexible form of magnetic flux regulation and de-regulation, but at the expense of a flow of electric current. Hybrid topologies exist, which incorporate both permanent magnets and field coils in the same configuration. The flexible excitation of a rotating electrical machine is employed by either brushless excitation techniques or by the injection of current by carbon brushes (static excitation).

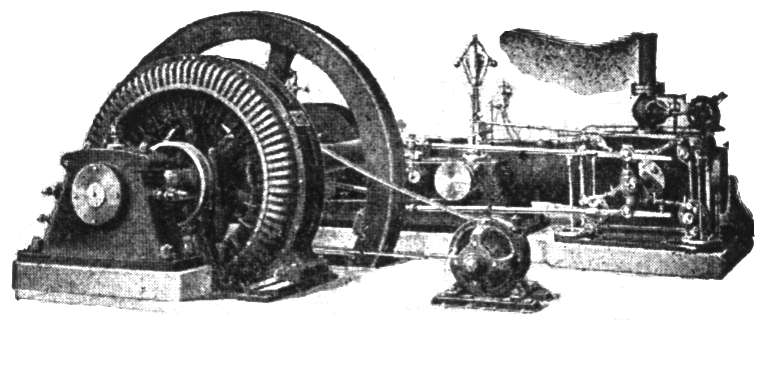
A 100 kVA direct-driven power station AC alternator with a separate belt-driven exciter generator, date c. 1917

== Excitation in generators ==
A self-excited shunt-wound DC generator is shown on the left, and a magneto DC generator with permanent field magnets is shown on the right. The shunt-wound generator output varies with the current draw, while the magneto output is steady regardless of load variations.

A separately-excited DC generator with bipolar field magnets. Separately-excited generators like this are commonly used for large-scale power transmission plants. The smaller generator can be either a magneto with permanent field magnets or another self-excited generator.

A field coil may be connected in shunt, in series, or in compound with the armature of a DC machine (motor or generator).

For a machine using field coils, as is the case in most large generators, the field must be established by a current in order for the generator to produce electricity. Although some of the generator's own output can be used to maintain the field once it starts up, an external source of current is needed for starting the generator. In any case, it is important to be able to control the field since this will maintain the system voltage.

=== Amplifier principle ===
Except for permanent magnet generators, a generator produces output voltage proportional to the magnetic flux, which is the sum of flux from the magnetization of the structure and the flux proportional to the field produced by the excitation current. If there is no excitation current the flux is tiny and the armature voltage is almost nil.

The field current controls the generated voltage allowing a power system’s voltage to be regulated to remove the effect of increasing armature current causing increased voltage drop in the armature winding conductors. In a system with multiple generators and a constant system voltage the current and power delivered by an individual generator is regulated by the field current. A generator is a current to voltage, or transimpedance amplifier. To avoid damage from progressively larger over-corrections, the field current must be adjusted more slowly than the effect of the adjustment propagates through the power system.

=== Separate excitation ===
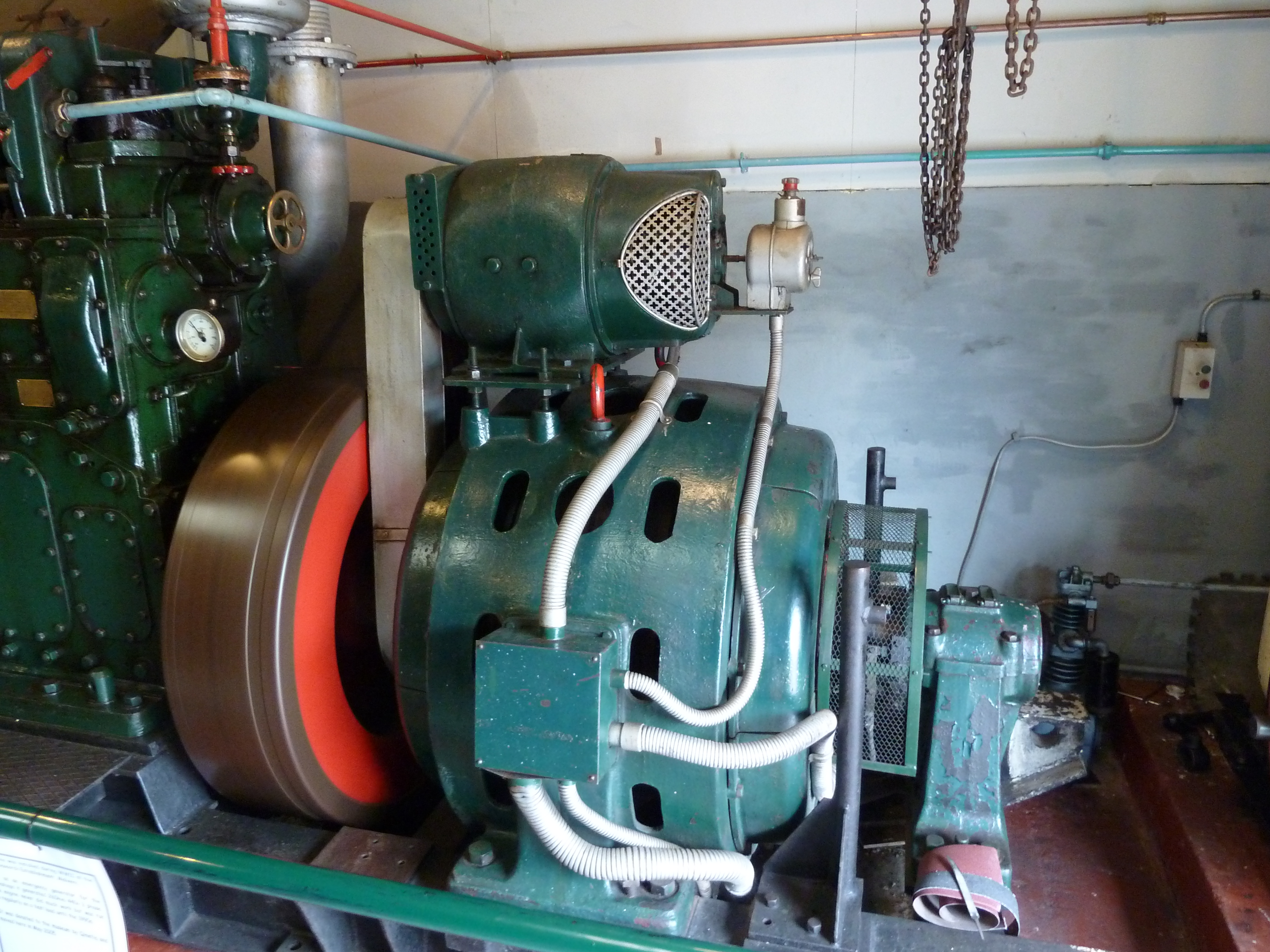
Alternator of 1930s diesel generating set, with excitation dynamo above

For large, or older, generators, it is usual for a separate exciter dynamo to be powered in parallel with the main power generator. This is a small permanent-magnet or battery-excited dynamo that produces the field current for the larger generator.

=== Self excitation ===
Modern generators with field coils are usually self-excited; i.e., some of the power output from the rotor is used to power the field coils. The rotor iron retains a degree of residual magnetism when the generator is turned off. The generator is started with no load connected; the initial weak field induces a weak current in the rotor coils, which in turn creates an initial field current, increasing the field strength, thus increasing the induced current in the rotor, and so on in a feedback process until the machine "builds up" to full voltage.

==== Starting ====
Self-excited generators must be started without any external load attached. Any external load will sink the electrical power from the generator before the capacity to generate electrical power can increase.

==== Variants ====
Multiple versions of self-exitation exist:

- a shunt, the simplest design, uses the main winding for the excitation power;
- an excitation boost system (EBS) is a shunt design with a separate small generator added to temporarily provide an energy boost when the main coil voltage drops (for example, due to a fault). The boost generator is not rated for permanent operation;
- an auxiliary winding is not connected to the main one and thus is not subject to voltage changes caused by the change of the load.

==== Field flashing ====
If the machine does not have enough residual magnetism to build up to full voltage, usually a provision is made to inject current into the field coil from another source. This may be a battery, a house unit providing direct current, or rectified current from a source of alternating current power. Since this initial current is required for a very short time, it is called field flashing. Even small portable generator sets may occasionally need field flashing to restart.

The critical field resistance is the maximum field circuit resistance for a given speed with which the shunt generator would excite. The shunt generator will build up voltage only if field circuit resistance is less than critical field resistance. It is a tangent to the open circuit characteristics of the generator at a given speed.

=== Brushless excitation ===
Brushless excitation creates the magnetic flux on the rotor of electrical machines without the need of carbon brushes. It is typically used for reducing the regular maintenance costs and to reduce the risk of brush-fire. It was developed in the 1950s, as a result of the advances in high-power semiconductor devices. The concept was using a rotating diode rectifier on the shaft of the synchronous machine to harvest induced alternating voltages and rectify them to feed the generator field winding.

Brushless excitation has been historically lacking the fast flux de-regulation, which has been a major drawback. However, new solutions have emerged. Modern rotating circuitry incorporates active de-excitation components on the shaft, extending the passive diode bridge. Moreover, their recent developments in high-performance wireless communication have realized fully controlled topologies on the shaft, such as the thyristor rectifiers and chopper interfaces.

== Sources ==
- Noland, Jonas Kristiansen; Nuzzo, Stefano; Tessarolo, Alberto; Alves, Erick Fernando (2019). "Excitation System Technologies for Wound-Field Synchronous Machines: Survey of Solutions and Evolving Trends". IEEE Access. 7: 109699–109718. doi:10.1109/ACCESS.2019.2933493. eISSN 2169-3536. hdl:11368/2958610. S2CID 201065415.

== See also ==
- Alternator
- Electric generator
- Electric motor
- Magneto (generator)
- Shunt generator
