= Haran Chandra Karmaker =

Electrical engineer

Haran Chandra Karmaker is an electrical engineer with the TECO-Westinghouse Motor Company in Round Rock, Texas. He was named a Fellow of the Institute of Electrical and Electronics Engineers (IEEE) in 2012 for his contributions to the analysis, design, and standards of large electrical machines.
