= E621 =

E621 may refer to:

== Rail vehicles ==
- FS Class E.621, an Italian electric locomotive class
- E621, a designation for a railcar type used in the Japanese E6 Series Shinkansen electrical multiple unit

== Other uses ==
- Monosodium glutamate, a food flavour enhancer (labelled E621 in the EU)
- e621 (website), a booru-style furry fandom imageboard
