= FS Class E.621 =

Italian locomotive class

FS class E.621
Type and origin
- Power type: Electric
- Builder: Ansaldo
- Total produced: 5
- Rebuild date: 1947
Specifications
- Configuration
  - UIC: Co+Co
- Gauge: 1,435 mm (4 ft 8 1/2 in)
- Wheel diameter: 1,060 mm (3 ft 6 in)
- Length: 11.77 m (38 ft 7 in)
- Width: 2.480 m (8 ft 1.6 in)
- Height: 3.685 m (12 ft 1.1 in)
- Loco weight: 60 t (59.1 long tons; 66.1 short tons)
- Electric system/s: 3,000 V DC overhead line
- Current pickup: single diamond pantograph
- Traction motors: 6
- Gear ratio: 19/58
Performance figures
- Maximum speed: 85 km/h (53 mph)
- Power output: 1,350 kW (1,810 hp); 1 hour rating
Career
- Operators: FS
- Withdrawn: 1964
- Scrapped: 1965
- Disposition: All withdrawn and scrapped

The FS Class E.621 was a class of five electric locomotives of the Italian State Railways (FS). They were rebuilt in 1947 from FS Class E.620, which was originally built in 1925. The main change was conversion from 650 V DC third rail to 3,000 V DC overhead line power supply.

The E.620 were articulated in two obviously separate sections, each with their own frames and bodywork. The cab was on one section giving something of a 'steeplecab' appearance and there was no body section spanning the articulated join. The rebuilt E.621 were very similar, although the bodywork was reworked or replaced. The cab now carried the single diamond pantograph and the two windows in each side were replaced by a single window. The prominent air brake reservoir cylinders were relocated from the cab roof to internally. The electrical equipment covers were now wider and higher. The increased amount of equipment on board required more air cooling, now through mesh grilles on the sides of the covers. Originally there had been external walkways, with railings, outboard of the equipment covers but there was no longer enough width for these and the only handrails were for the steps to the cab. A second set of cab steps was added for the other end of the cab.

== Electrical conversion ==
The locomotives were built in 1925 by the Officine Meccaniche Reggiane, reusing electrical parts from withdrawn railcars. There were two 3-axle bogies and six traction motors, giving a maximum speed of 85 km/h. The motors were nose-suspended and geared to the axles.

The rebuild was done to enable the locomotives to work under a 3,000-volt overhead line power supply and to cope with a post-war shortage of locomotives. In order to use the electrical equipment, and the 650-volt motors, without excessive modifications, the metadyne system was adopted. This halved the line voltage of 3,000 volts to 1,500 volts. The 1,500 volt supply was then fed to the motors in series pairs, giving 750 volts per motor. The power output was increased from 950 kW (1,270 hp) continuous to 1,350 kW (1,810 hp) (1 hour rating).

== Service ==
All were used for station pilot duties at Milano Centrale, reducing the number of steam locomotives and their smoke underneath the station's overall roof. They also worked around the Milan area, and the station of Porta Nuova. They were based at, and finally stored before scrapping, the engine depot of Milano Smistamento.
