= Association of Electrical and Mechanical Trades =

United Kingdom trade organization

- Abbreviation: AEMT
- Formation: January 1, 1945; 81 years ago
- Headquarters: York, United Kingdom
- Members: 285
- Staff: 1-10
- Website: www.theaemt.com
- Formerly called: The Association of Electrical Machinery Trades

The Association of Electrical and Mechanical Trades (AEMT) is a United Kingdom trade association representing engineering companies in the service and repair industry.

== History ==
The association was first formed after the 2nd World War by "a group of electrical machinery buyers and sellers in order to negotiate as a group with government departments in the purchasing of government surplus electrical plant." During the War years of 1939-1945, there are accounts of Government Departments urgently requiring the services of Members from the Association of Electrical Machinery Traders, whose job was to keep the "wheels turning in Factories and Industrial Establishments of all kinds, which rely upon electrical energy for their source of driving power."

On 1 January 1945, William "Ted" Lawton called together a number of these traders to the Holborn Restaurant, London in order to discuss the official formation of the Association of Electrical Machinery Traders, so that they may build a purchasing power, in order to negotiate the exchange of industrial electrical equipment from H. M. Government left over from the war. In so doing, they saved the public purse the huge cost of administering and auctioning off the equipment in the UK.

Among the founders were, "Laurie Bowers, Ralph Gill, Grant of Glasgow, Ferguson of Brittania, Dearlove of Fyffe Wilson, Snape of Midland Counties, Thompson and Ainsworth from Lancashire, Smith from Carlisle, and Vernon from Sheffield" With Bob Joseph among them also. Ted Lawton served as Chairman and sub-sequent President, with John Morgan as the Secretary.

In 1950, the title of the association's journal was renamed the "Association of Electrical Machinery Trades" to account for the increase in members from the repair trades. The association's main objectives served to "enhance the status of the Repair and Merchanting trade, and to encourage firms engaged in the business to provide a high standard of servicing and business ethics."

== Activities and publications ==
- 1984:AEMT and BEAMA jointly produced the first Code of Practice for "[t]he repair and overhaul of electrical equipment for use in potentially explosive atmospheres". The usefulness of the document was recognised internationally as the Ex repair standard, IEC BS EN 60079-19 first published in 1993.
- 1984: the Association also produced the "AEMT Code of Practice on Safety in Electrical Testing", which was updated in 1991.
- 1986: the Association published the "AEMT AC Three Phase Stator Winding Connections", this was updated in 1994.
- 1988: the AEMT foresaw a need for a Quality Assurance Standard for the repair industry and launched with the BSI the BSI QA Sector Scheme for companies to get certified under. A code of practice was put together to help members conform with the UK COSHH requirements. This was published in 1991 as the “AEMT Code of Practice on Handling, Use and Storage of Hazardous Substances” or COSHH.
- 1993: the AEMT Code of Practice on Safety in Electrical Testing was adopted as an International Standard: IEC60079 19: “Electrical Apparatus: Repair and overhaul for apparatus used in explosive atmospheres other than mines.”
- 1995: under Peter Boxall’s presidency, the name was changed to the "Association of Electrical and Mechanical Trades" to include the growing number of companies involved in the service and repair of pumps, gearboxes, transformers, electronic and mechanical repairs, as well as traditional rotating electrical machinery.
- 1996: the Association carried out a study and produced the "AEMT Good Practice Guide - The Repair of Induction Motors. Best Practices to maintain Energy Efficiency"
- 2003: the AEMT invited EASA (The Electrical Apparatus service Association of America) to join them to produce a further study on larger machines. This study produced "The Effect of Repair/Rewinding on Motor Efficiency" The AEMT EASA Rewind Study incorporated "Good Practice to maintain Motor Efficiency"
- 2007: IEC 60079 19: 2007 "Explosive Atmospheres: Equipment Repair Overhaul and Reclamation" was updated to include equipment used in mines and mechanical equipment.
- 2010: the AEMT produced the first “Ex Labels and Reference Data" booklet.

=== Publications ===
- The AEMT Journal Association of Electrical and Mechanical Trades
- The AEMT International Yearbook
- AEMT Code of Practice for "The Repair and Overhaul of Electrical Equipment for use in Potentially Explosive Atmospheres"
- AEMT Code of Practice on Safety in Electrical Testing
- International Standard: IEC60079 19: Electrical Apparatus: Repair and overhaul for apparatus used in explosive atmospheres other than mines.
- IEC 60079 19: 2007 Explosive Atmospheres: Equipment Repair Overhaul and Reclamation
- AEMT AC Three Phase Stator Winding Connections
- AEMT Code of Practice on Handling, Use and Storage of Hazardous Substances
- AEMT Good Practice Guide. The Repair of Induction Motors. Best Practices to maintain Energy Efficiency
- Ex Labels and Reference Data
- AEMT Explosive Atmospheres: Equipment Repair and Overhaul using BS EN & IEC 60079 19: 2011
- Explosive Atmospheres: Equipment Repair, Overhaul, and Reclamation
