= FS Class E.620 =

Electric locomotives for the Italian State Railways

FS class E.620
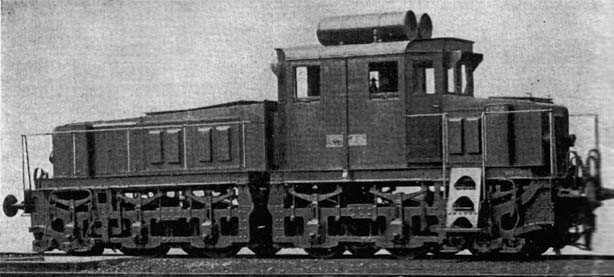
Type and origin
- Power type: Electric
- Builder: Officine Reggiane
- Build date: 1925
- Total produced: 5
Specifications
- Configuration
  - UIC: Co+Co
- Gauge: 1,435 mm (4 ft 8 1/2 in) standard gauge
- Wheel diameter: 1,050 mm (41.34 in)
- Length: 11.77 m (38 ft 7 3/8 in)
- Loco weight: 54 t (53.1 long tons; 59.5 short tons)
- Electric system/s: 650 V DC third rail
- Traction motors: 6
Performance figures
- Maximum speed: 85 km/h (53 mph)
- Power output: 950 kW (1,270 hp) continuous
Career
- Operators: Ferrovie dello Stato Italiane

The FS Class E.620 was a class of third-rail electric locomotives built by Officine Meccaniche Reggiane for the Italian State Railways (FS). They were built in 1925 using motors and electrical equipment from Class E.10 railcars which had been withdrawn in 1923. After World War II they were converted to 3,000 volt DC operation and became FS Class E.621.

They were equipped with six nose-suspended direct current traction motors with a total output of 950 kW (1,270 hp). This power was transferred to the axles via a geared final drive and through this they had a maximum speed of 85 km/h (53 mph). They received power from a 650 V DC third rail system, with the traction current being picked up by contact shoes.
