= Growler (electrical device) =

Electrical device primarily used for testing a motor for shorted coils

Silver Beauty Growler

A growler is an electrical device primarily used for testing a motor for shorted coils. A growler consists of a coil of wire wrapped around an iron core and connected to a source of alternating current. When placed on the armature or stator core of a motor the growler acts as the primary of a transformer and the armature coils act as the secondary. A "feeler", a thin strip of steel (hacksaw blade) can be used as the short detector.

== Motor testing ==
The alternating magnetic flux set up by the growler passes through the windings of the armature coil, generating an alternating voltage in the coil. A short in the coil creates a closed circuit that will act like the secondary coil of a transformer, with the growler acting like the primary coil. This will induce an alternating current in the shorted armature that will in turn cause an alternating magnetic field to encircle the shorted armature coil. A flat, broad, flexible piece of metal containing iron is used to detect the magnetic field generated by a shorted armature. A hacksaw blade is commonly used as a feeler. The alternating magnetic field induced by a shorted armature is strong at the surface of the armature, and when the feeler is lightly touched to the iron core of an armature winding, small currents are induced in the feeler that generate a third alternating magnetic field surrounding the feeler.

With the growler energized, the feeler is moved from slot to slot. When the feeler is moved over a slot containing the shorted coil, the alternating magnetic field will alternately attract and release the feeler, causing it to vibrate in synch with the alternating current. A strong vibration of the feeler accompanied by a growling noise indicated that the coil is shorted.

== Other uses ==
Along with the standard application the growler can be used:

- to test series and interpoles (commutating) fields from a DC motor
- to determine phasing and polarity in multiwinding armatures
- to test rotors in rotating frequency changers, as well as in wound rotors
- to test shorts between turns in taped coils before installation into an armature or a stator
- as a low voltage isolation transformer
- as a high voltage autotransformer bucking or boosting for numerous tests on various types of equipment
- for preheating or baking armatures and rotors.
