= Harry Ward Leonard =

American electrical engineer & inventor (1861-1915)

H. Ward Leonard
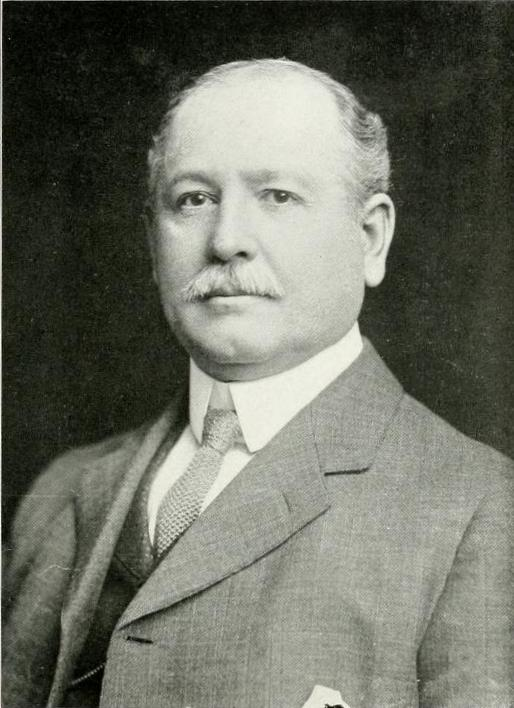
- Born: February 8, 1861; Cincinnati, Ohio, U.S.
- Died: February 18, 1915 (aged 54); New York City, U.S.
- Known for: Ward Leonard motor control system
- Awards: John Scott Medal (1903)
- Scientific career
- Fields: inventor, electrical engineer

Harry Ward Leonard (February 8, 1861 – February 18, 1915) was an American electrical engineer and inventor. He is best known for his invention, the Ward Leonard motor control system. Equipment based on this invention remained in service into the 21st century.

== Early life and heritage ==
Harry Ward Leonard was born on February 8, 1861, in Cincinnati, Ohio, to Ezra George Leonard and Henrietta Dana Ward. He was the fourth of their six children. He was a great great grandson of American Revolutionary War General Artemas Ward. In 1895, he was married to Carolyn Good in Geneva, Switzerland.

As a student at the Massachusetts Institute of Technology (MIT), Leonard was instrumental in founding the student newspaper, The Tech, and served as the president of the paper’s board of directors. He graduated from MIT in 1883.

== Career ==
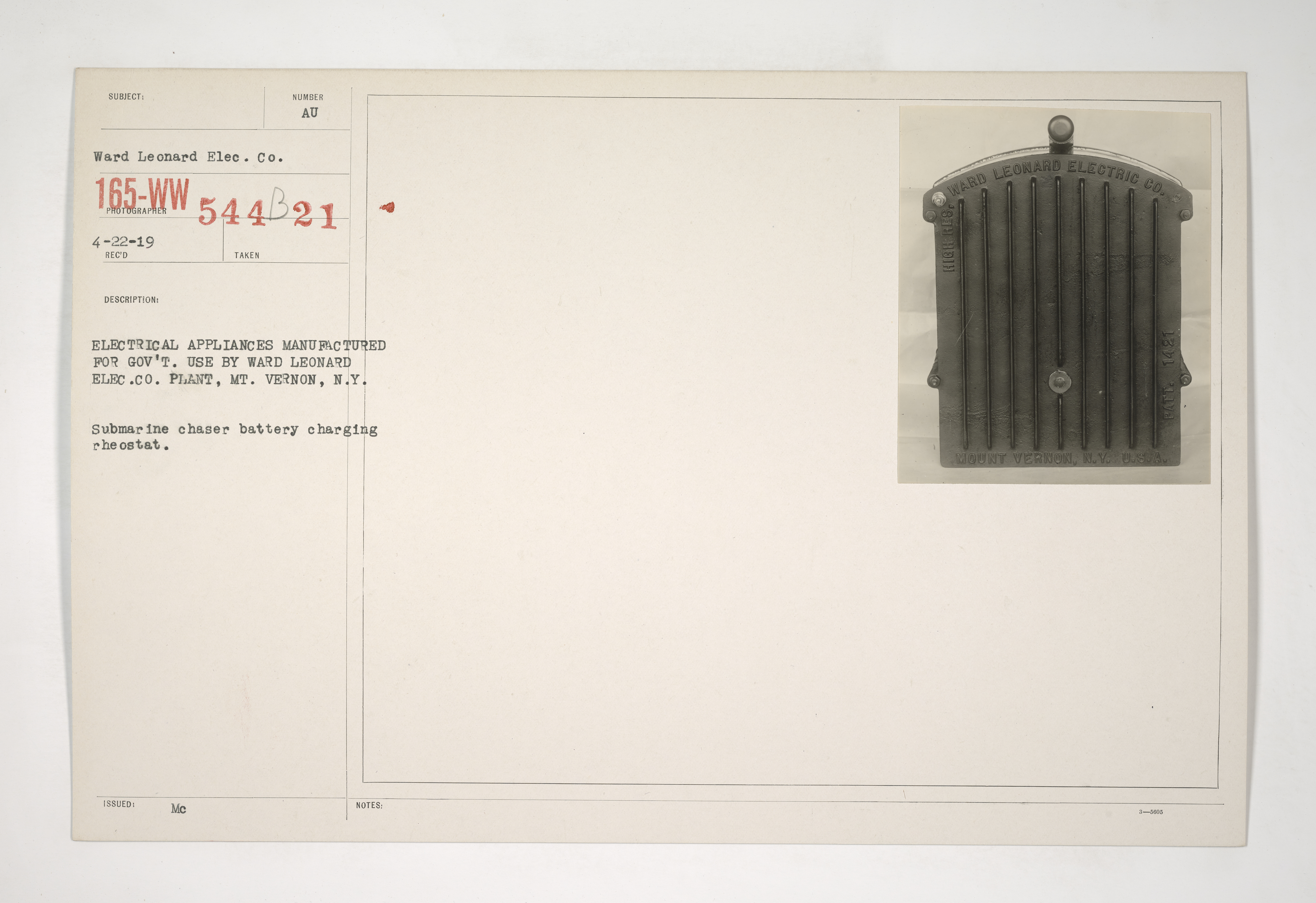
A rheostat manufactured by Ward Leonard Electric Company

After graduating from MIT, Leonard was employed by Thomas Edison to help introduce the Edison central-station electric power distribution system. Within four years, he was promoted to the position of general superintendent of the Western Electric Light Company of Chicago, Illinois. The following year, he established Leonard and Izard, a firm that set up electric railways and generating stations. In 1889, his firm was acquired by Edison and Leonard became the general manager of the Edison operations in the United States and Canada. In 1896, Leonard organized and became president of Ward Leonard Electric as an Edison company in Hoboken, New Jersey. In 1898, he left the Edison organization and incorporated his own Ward Leonard Electric Company on February 19, 1898, in the village of Bronxville in Westchester County, New York.

While working for Edison, Leonard patented a number of inventions and he continued developing new ideas throughout his career. He was granted patents for more than 100 inventions of electrical distribution and control systems and related equipment.

== The Ward Leonard motor control system ==
The Ward Leonard motor control system was Mr. Leonard’s best known and most lasting invention. It was introduced in about 1891 and soon became the most widely used type of electric motor speed control.

In a Ward Leonard system, a prime mover drives a direct current (DC) generator at a constant speed. The armature of the DC generator is connected directly to the armature of a DC motor. The DC motor drives the load equipment at an adjustable speed. The motor speed is adjusted by adjusting the output voltage of the generator using a rheostat to adjust the excitation current in the field winding. The motor field current is usually not adjusted, but the motor field is sometimes reduced to increase the speed above the base speed. The prime mover is usually an alternating current (AC) motor, but a DC motor or an engine might be used instead. To provide the DC field excitation power supply, Ward Leonard systems usually include an exciter generator that is driven by the prime mover.

Although only technical specialists are likely to be familiar with Ward Leonard systems, many millions of people have ridden in elevators powered by Ward Leonard drives. From the 1920s through the 1980s most electrically driven elevators used Ward Leonard control and many systems remained in use at the beginning of the 21st century.

Many variations of the Ward Leonard system have been implemented, but they have generally continued to be called Ward Leonard systems. H. Ward Leonard and many others have patented auxiliary control systems used to regulate the motor speed as required to automatically perform specific tasks such as controlling pump speed to regulate flow.

Mechanical types of adjustable-speed drives and other electrical types continued to be used and new types developed after the Ward Leonard system was introduced. Electron tube types of DC motor controls began to be developed in the 1920s but electronic controls didn't seriously begin to displace the Ward Leonard system until thyristor controlled drives were developed in the late 1960s. By the mid-1970s, Ward Leonard drives were rapidly becoming obsolete, but the replacement of existing Ward Leonard drives has continued past the end of the 20th century.

== Sudden death ==
H. Ward Leonard was an active member of the American Institute of Electrical Engineers, publishing technical papers, attending meetings and making presentations. He died suddenly on February 18, 1915, in New York while attending the annual dinner of the American Institute of Electrical Engineers.

== See also ==
- Booster (electric power)
- Motor-generator
- Rotary transformer
- Ward leonard control
