= Metadyne =

Direct current electrical machine

A metadyne is a direct current electrical machine with two pairs of brushes. It can be used as an amplifier or rotary transformer. It is similar to a third brush dynamo but has additional regulator or "variator" windings. It is also similar to an amplidyne except that the latter has a compensating winding which fully counteracts the effect of the flux produced by the load current. The technical description is "a cross-field direct current machine designed to utilize armature reaction". A metadyne can convert a constant-voltage input into a constant-current, variable-voltage output.

== History ==
The word metadyne is derived from the Greek words for conversion of power. While the name is believed to have been coined by Joseph Maximus Pestarini (Italian: Giuseppe Massimo Pestarini) in a paper which he submitted to the Montefiore International Contest at Liège, Belgium, in 1928, the type of machine which it described had been known since the 1880s. The first known British patent for a direct-current, cross-field generator was obtained by A. I. Gravier of Paris in 1882, and two further patents were obtained by E. Rosenberg in 1904 and 1907. Rosenberg later became the chief electrical engineer for Metropolitan-Vickers, and his machine produced a cross field by applying a short-circuit to an additional set of brushes. M. Osnos looked at the practical arrangements for several such machines in 1907, and in the same year, Felton and Guilleaume obtained a British patent, number 26,607, which described auxiliary windings, armature windings and multiple commutators, although all in fairly general terms. He also indicated that they could be used to transform a constant voltage into a constant current. Other patents were obtained prior to 1910 by Mather & Platt, Brown Boverei and Bruce Peebles.

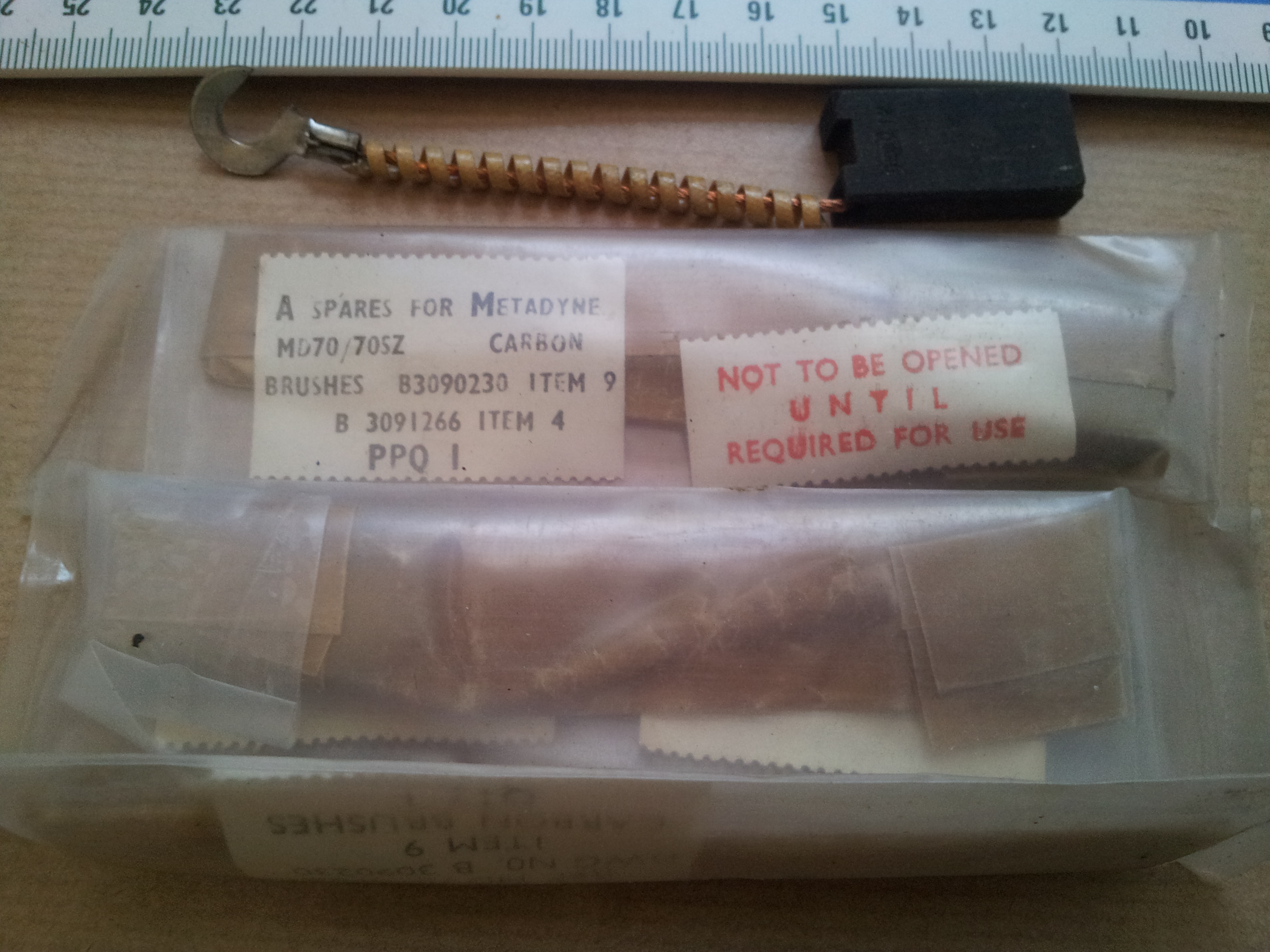
Spare Metadyne carbon brushes. They are individually wrapped and, together with labels, sealed in plastic. Total length including the connecting wire and ring is 115 mm. The thickness of the carbon slab is 8 mm.

Pestarini worked on developing the theory of such machines between 1922 and 1930, although he concentrated on their static characteristics, rather than their dynamic characteristics. He contributed three papers on the subject to Revue Générale de l'Electricité in 1930, which included some practical applications. The main one was the use of the constant-current output for the control of traction motors on electric vehicles and the operation of cranes, areas in which he had some practical experience, following trials in conjunction with the Alsthom Company in France. In 1930, he made a trip to Britain, and the Metropolitan-Vickers company took his ideas and developed a working system. Unlike Rosenberg's solution, Pestarini, who later became a Professor at the Istituto elettrotecnico nazionale Galileo Ferraris in Turin, connected the additional brushes to an external supply to produce a transformer metadyne. The machine worked as a voltage-to-current amplifier because the flux generated by the current to the load opposed the flux in the control circuit. Development work at Metropolitan-Vickers in the 1930s was led by Arnold Tustin, and the company held the British patents for the Metadyne.

Pestarini also visited the United States in 1930, although there is no record of the system being used there. The General Electric engineers, led by Ernst Alexanderson, were interested, but modified the design by the addition of a compensating winding, which counteracted the effect of the flux produced by the load current. This turned the machine from a voltage-to-current amplifier into a voltage-to-voltage amplifier, and they called the new variant an Amplidyne. The development costs were largely funded by US naval contracts for the development of vertical stabilisers, which were used to improve the aiming and firing of guns on ships. During the same period, the Macfarlane Engineering Company, who were based in Glasgow, developed a variant of the cross field machine quite independently, which they named the Magnicon.

Pestarini filed a patent on the metadyne machine in France on 14 January 1932, and submitted it to the United States Patent Office at the end of the year, on 23 December. The US patent was granted on 30 January 1934. He submitted a second US patent for an improved machine in November 1946, which was granted on 10 June 1952.

== Operation ==
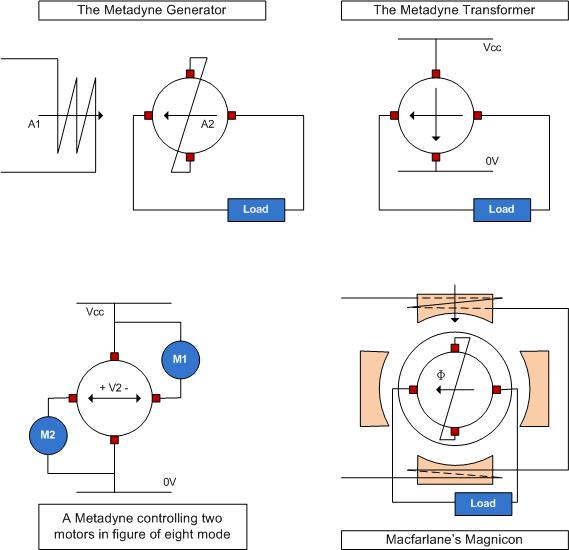
Three arrangements of a metadyne cross-field DC machine, and the construction of Macfarlane's Magnicon

The diagram shows three arrangements of a metadyne machine. In all cases, compensation windings have been omitted for clarity. The first arrangement represents a one-cycle cross-field machine. In a normal DC machine, the effect of the excitation current generates a flux (A1), which in turn generates a quadrature flux which is at right angles to the exciting flux. By wiring the quadrature brushes together, current is produced in the armature, and the flux that this produces (A2) is again at right angles to the quadrature axis, resulting in an armature reaction which is directly opposed to the original excitation. This feature is fundamental to the machine, and does not depend on its direction of rotation. When the armature reaction is partially compensated by a compensation winding, the uncompensated portion of the armature reaction acts in this way. As the output current rises, it suppresses the effect of the excitation, until it reaches a state where there is just enough excitation to maintain the current. Any further increase would eliminate the flux which sustains its operation, and the current is maintained irrespective of the resistance of the load or the back emf produced by it. The machine thus acts as a constant-current generator, where the current is proportional to the excitation.

The second diagram shows a machine with no excitation winding, but instead, a constant voltage is connected to the quadrature brushes. This produces a flux similar to the one produced by the rotation of the armature in the excitation flux in the first example. The operation of the machine is therefore very similar, with the output current rising until the flux it produces almost counteracts the flux generated by the applied voltage. Tustin has shown that the input and output power are the same, and so the machine transforms the constant-voltage input into a constant-current output. As with the metadyne generator, the Metadyne transformer can be partially compensated, and will continue to operate as a constant-current device until the compensation exceeds 97 per cent.

The third diagram shows a metadyne connected to two separate motors, and this arrangement was often used for the control of traction motors on electric trains. Connecting them in this way reduces the effective loading on the Metadyne, and enables a smaller machine to be installed. The Metadyne acts as a "positive or negative booster". If Vcc is the supply voltage, and V2 is the output voltage of the Metadyne, then the total voltage across the load can vary from 0 to 2·Vcc, as V2 varies between −Vcc and +Vcc. Although the system is prone to the currents in the two halves of the load becoming unbalanced, this can be corrected by the provision of extra series windings, which act like an additional circuit resistance.

=== Rosenberg generator ===
The Rosenberg generator is very similar to the Metadyne generator, both in its construction and its electrical connection. It generally does not have a compensation winding, so that the whole of the armature reaction opposes the initial excitation. Parts of the magnetic circuit are normally not laminated, which creates delays between excitations and fluxes, but the machines are used in applications where a quick response is not essential. Their predominant use has been in trains, where they are axle-driven, and used to provide lighting and the charging of batteries. An axle-driven generator is subject to variable speeds and changes in the direction of rotation, but the characteristics of the machine allow it to produce useful energy down to very low speeds. At slow speeds, the output voltage increases with the square of the speed, but the magnetic circuit soon becomes saturated, resulting in much smaller increases as the speed increases. When used in circuits which include batteries charged from the output, a rectifier or reverse-current cut-out is normally required to prevent discharge of the batteries through the generator at very low speeds, or when the train stops.

=== Magnicon ===
The Magnicon, developed by Macfarlane's in Scotland, is similar to the Metadyne, but whereas the latter has a two-pole armature winding, the Magnicon has a four-pole lap winding, and is sometimes referred to as a Metadyne with a short-pitched armature winding. They have been supplied to operate hoists and winches on ships. The stator of a Magnicon has four polar projections, spaced at 90 degrees, and one pair of them is excited. The pair of brushes which are on the same axis as the excited poles are short-circuited, resulting in a large current. The magnetomotive force (MMF) of this current acts on the non-excited poles, creating a working flux (Φ) and the output voltage. As with a full-pitch Metadyne, the armature reaction of the output current is 90 degrees out of phase, and therefore opposes the original excitation. Advantages over the normal Metadyne are that the number of exciting and compensating coils is halved to two each per cycle, and the shorter pitch of the coils results in less overhang at the ends of the windings. However, the design creates idle currents in the armature, which result in losses, and on larger machines, where interpoles are required, each interpole must be fitted with two coils, one for each of the brush circuits. Tustin argued that there is little advantage of the Magnicon over the Metadyne for smaller machines, and for larger machines, which require interpoles to be fitted, insufficient analysis has been carried out to make a judgement.

== Uses ==
Metadynes have been used to control the aiming of large guns and for speed control in electric trains, in particular the London Underground O and P Stock. They have been superseded by solid state devices.

=== Traction control ===
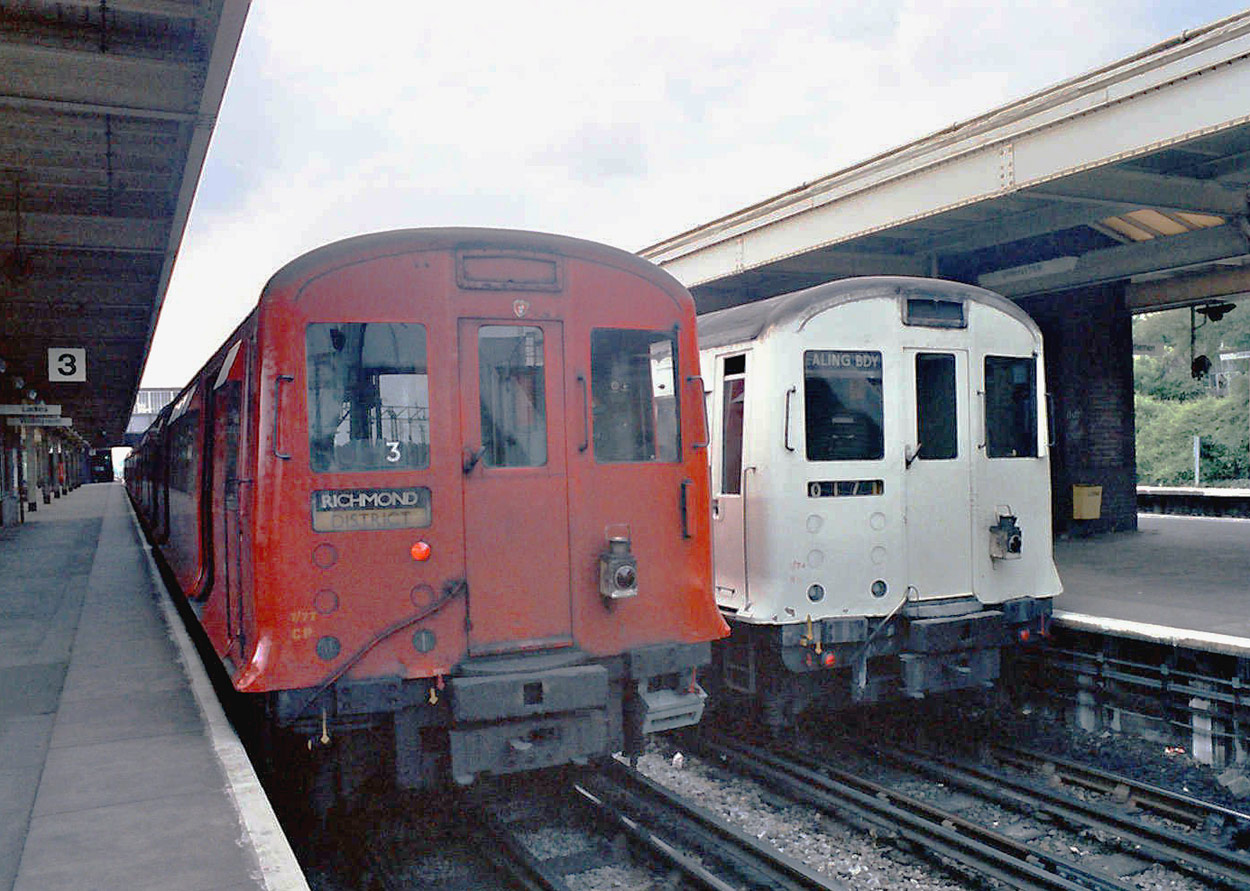
A London Underground CP train (in red) at Upminster. They were originally fitted with Metadyne controls and were the first electric multiple units to use regenerative braking.

In the early 1930s, the London Underground were aware of the development of the metadyne equipment taking place at Metropolitan-Vickers, and the potential for regenerative braking which it provided. Before committing to an untried system, they therefore built a test train, by converting six cars originally built between 1904 and 1907 for the Metropolitan Railway. The work was carried out at Acton Works in 1934. Since a single metadyne unit could be used to control four motors, and each motor car had two motors, they were formed into two-car units, with a driving cab at the outer ends. By coupling the units together, trials of a two-car, four-car and six-car train could be carried out. The metadyne unit weighed about 3 tons, and consisted of three rotating machines, an exciter, a regulator and the actual metadyne machine, which were linked together mechanically. Electrically, the traction supply was fed into the machine, and the output fed the motors, without the need for starting resistances.

The test train ran through much of 1935 and 1936, and was tried on nearly all of the electrified tracks on the Metropolitan line and the District line. Once the concept had been proved to be reliable, the train was also used in passenger service. Besides the regenerative braking, the acceleration was found to be particularly smooth. When the decision was taken to proceed with the new system on the O and P stock, the test train was dismantled, and the equipment was fitted to three battery locomotives built by the Gloucester Railway Carriage and Wagon Company, which were part of a batch of nine vehicles supplied between 1936 and 1938. The equipment was particularly suitable for battery locomotives, as the lack of starting resistances reduced the amount of power wasted when starting and stopping frequently. At slow speeds, conventional control systems would often overheat, but the metadyne-equipped locomotives could pull trains weighing 100 tons for long distances at speeds as low as 3 mph (4.8 km/h) without problems. However, the complexity of the equipment, and the difficulty of maintaining the metadyne machine, resulted in the locomotives not being used sufficiently, and they were withdrawn for scrapping in 1977.

The main production run of O Stock consisted of 116 motor cars, which were formed into 58 two-car units. Trials began with a four-car formation on the District line between High Street Kensington and Putney Bridge in September 1937, and a six-car formation began working on the Hammersmith line in January 1938. There were some technical problems, caused by the demands put on the power supply system when a train of six motor cars started, and the amount of power that such a train attempted to return to the system when the regenerative brakes were used. This was partially mitigated by ordering a further 58 trailer cars, and converting each two-car unit into a three-car unit, by inserting a trailer car into the formation. A batch of P Stock was then ordered, to replace the trains on the Metropolitan line. Although O and P Stock units could be coupled together, the metadyne units in particular were not the same, and could not be interchanged between the builds. By the early 1950s, this was a serious disadvantage, when a series of failures occurred, which required extensive repairs. A decision was taken to remove the equipment and replace it with a Pneumatic Cam Motor (PCM) system, using spare controllers from the 1938 tube stock. The first converted train entered service on 31 March 1955, and the stock was redesignated at CO/CP Stock, since it contained cars from both batches. All of the metadyne equipment was subsequently replaced.

Despite the shortcomings which led to its demise, the metadyne system as introduced in 1936 on the O Stock trains was the first in the world to provide regenerative braking on an electric multiple unit. Acceleration was smoother than on a train which switched starting resistances, and when braking the metadyne unit returned power to the tracks, which could be used by other trains if needed. However, conditions were not always ideal, and the substations were not really designed to cope with regeneration, which meant that often the train switched to rheostatic braking, where the power was dissipated in a resistance bank. The weight of the equipment was also a serious drawback.

=== Gun control ===
In the period immediately before the Second World War, there was increasing interest in power-operated gun controls, although military authorities were nervous of introducing a complex system which would have to be maintained in the field. However, with the increasing speed of aircraft, the need to enable searchlights, anti-aircraft guns and dual purpose naval guns to move ever faster to track their movement meant that some form of powered control was essential. Engineers were faced with the problem of making a heavy piece of equipment, such as a gun on its mounting carriage, track an input signal in a smooth and accurate fashion, with very little lag between changes in the input and the actual position of the gun mount. The gun needed to be aimed at the target at all times, and moving at the correct velocity to remain so.

A human operator anticipates errors, and can also compensate for known lags in the operation of the system. Mimicking of this behaviour had been achieved for electronic signals and low-power electromechanical systems, but gun control was on a completely different scale, with machinery weighing tons and having significant inertia needing to move at velocities of up to 30 degrees per second, and accelerations of 10 degrees per second^{2}. In 1937, the Admiralty had placed an order with Metropolitan Vickers for a control system for an eight-barrel Pom-Pom gun. Pestarini had developed a similar system for the Italian navy. The original design used a single Metadyne to supply a constant current to the armatures of motors mounted on several guns. Each was then controlled by manually adjusting the field current. Tustin, who did most of the design work, found that the system had a large time constant, due to the inductance of the field windings. In order to improve its response, he supplied the field windings with a constant current, and used a partially compensated Metadyne to control the armature current of each motor. Tustin compared Ward Leonard control systems, Metadynes and Amplidynes, and accepted that each had its merits, but favoured the Metadyne, of which he had several years experience from their use in traction control.

== See also ==
- Adjustable-speed drive
- Amplidyne
- Brushed DC electric motor
- Electric motor
- Electronic speed control
- Motor controller
- Motor–generator
