= Milano Smistamento =

Milano Smistamento is the main railway station marshalling yard in Milan, managed by Mercitalia Rail.

It is the largest railway marshalling yard in Italy.

== History ==
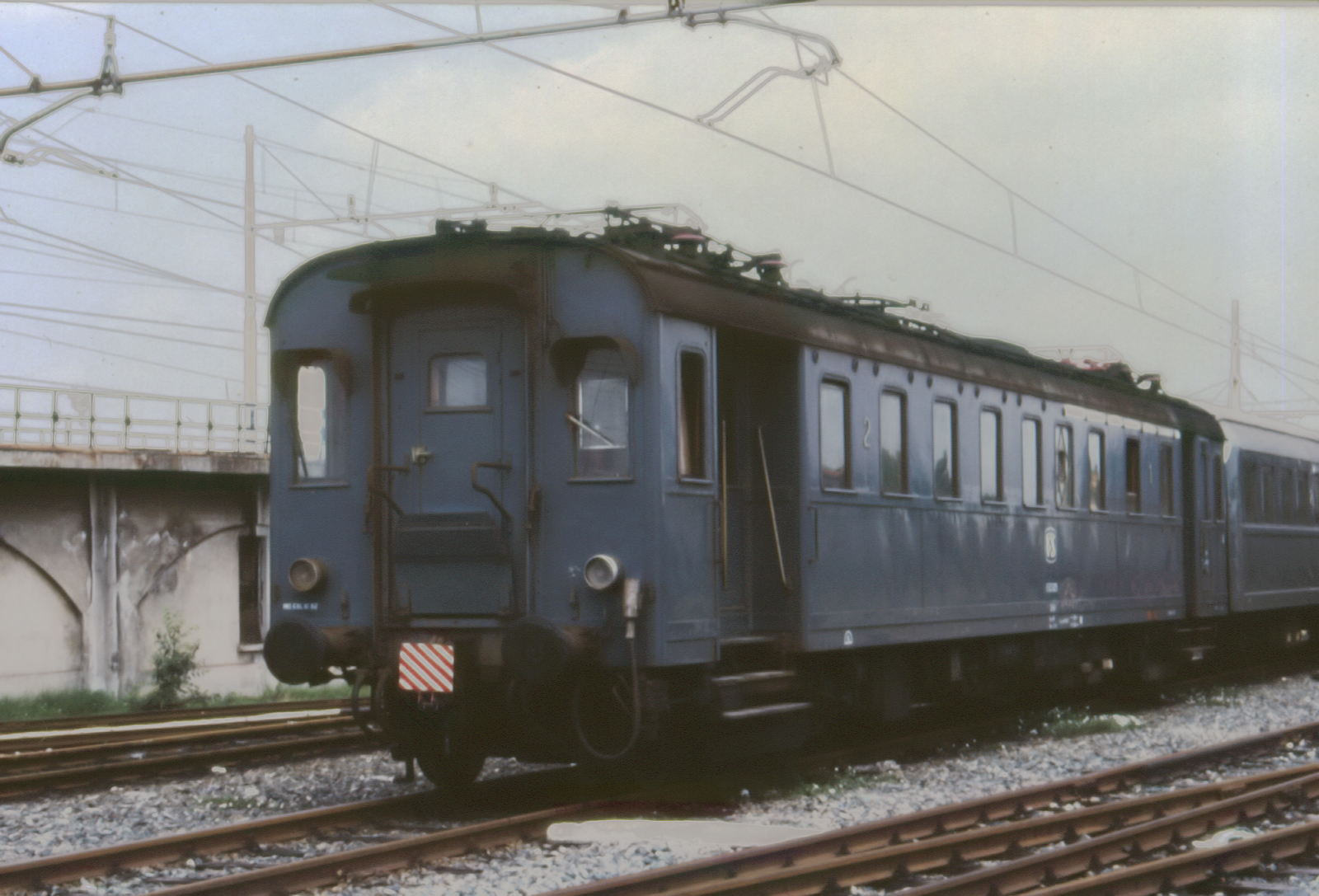
An FS E.623 railcar at the yard in 1986.

It was built in the 1920s in close connection with the new Centrale station to establish a large freight yard strategically located near the city, towards the northeast.

The large area is crossed by the line from Milan Lambrate to Venice Santa Lucia and connected to the contemporary Milan belt line, linking both Milan Greco Pirelli and Milan Rogoredo.

== Structures and facilities ==
The yard has forty-eight tracks with through access; for this reason, it is the largest railway marshalling yard in Italy.

=== Locomotive depot ===
Milano Smistamento also served as a depot for steam locomotives and had two large turntables, one of which was covered.

It currently functions as a locomotive depot with maintenance activities for electric locomotives. Only one turntable remains, while the workshops are connected, in addition to some tracks, by two transfer bridges.

The yard also houses historical rolling stock, including steam locomotives, electric locomotives (such as FS E.636, FS E.646 and FS E.656) and Diesel units (FS group 211 railcar).

=== Railway workshop ===
Between the two turntables, one of which is decommissioned, towards the outskirts, there is the railway workshop area, equipped with a heavy-duty lift.

== Gallery ==
=== Rolling stock ===
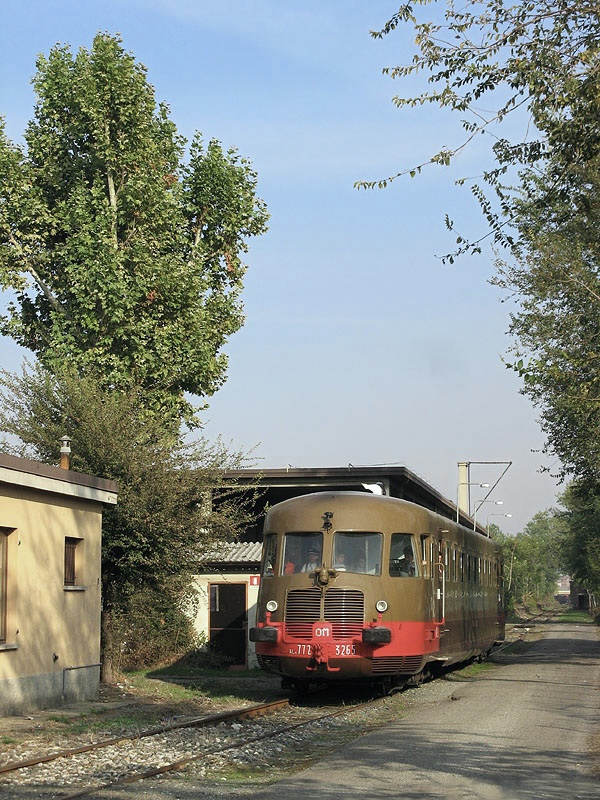
ALn 772.3265 diesel railcar restored for special trains

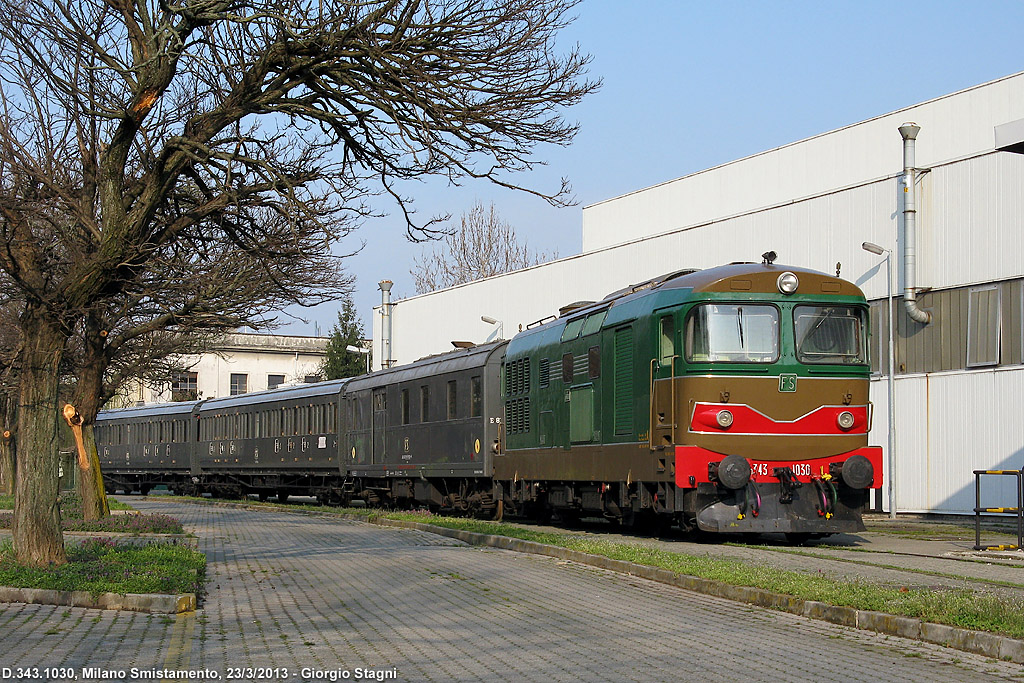
D.343.1030 repainted in "historic" livery at the head of a train, displayed with other restored rolling stock in the Milan Smistamento Depot

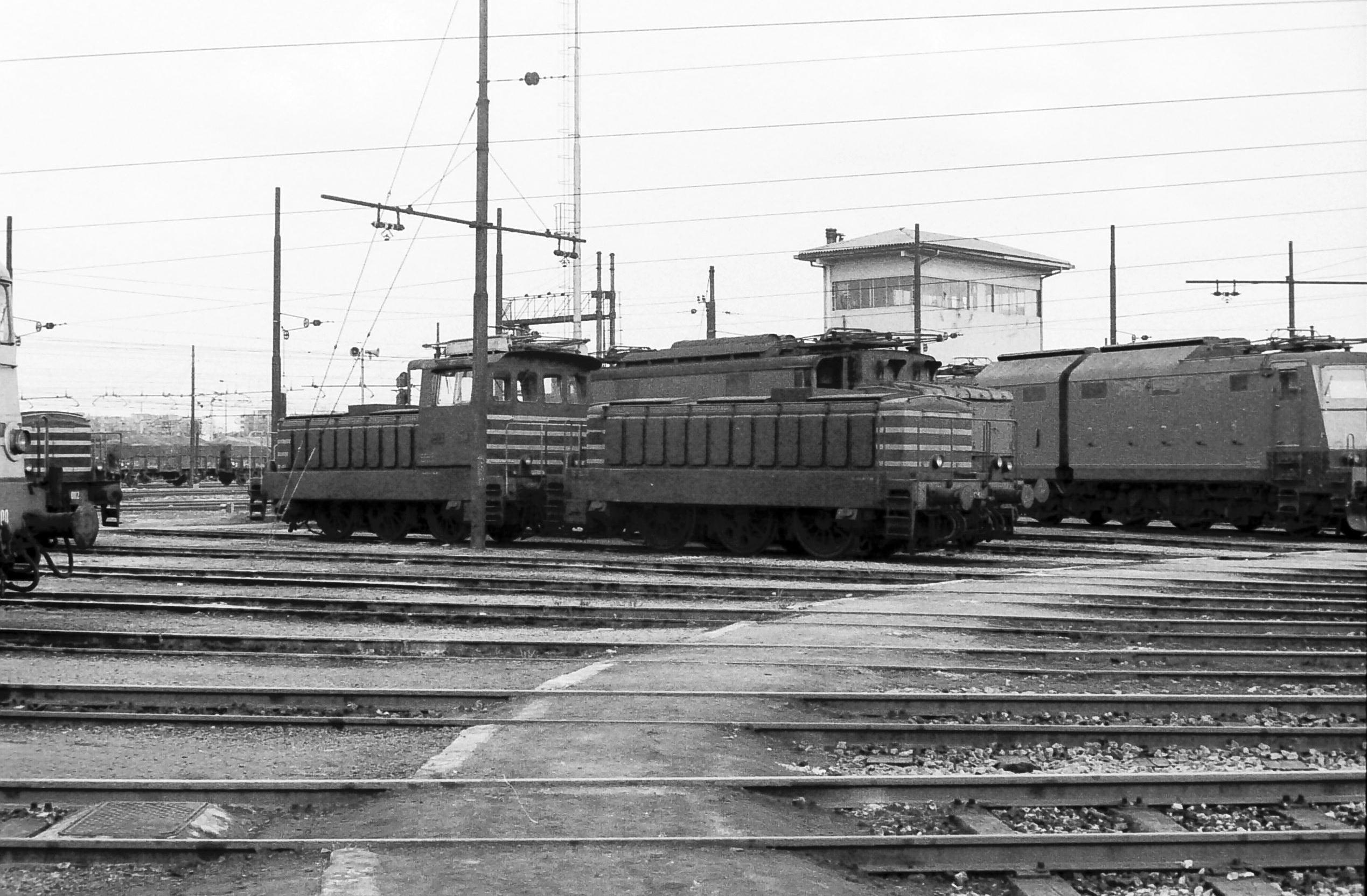
FS E.321.104 with coupled unit E.322.104 on the turntable of the locomotive depot (23 March 1975)

Map of the Milan railway node after modifications made between 1914 and 1931

== Bibliography ==
- Giuseppe De Finetti, Giovanni Cislaghi, Mara De Benedetti, Milano: costruzione di una città, Trento, 2002, ISBN 88-203-3092-X
