= Induction generator =

Type of AC electrical generator

An induction generator (or asynchronous generator) is a type of alternating current (AC) electrical generator that uses the principles of induction motors to produce electric power. Induction generators operate by mechanically turning their rotors faster than synchronous speed. A regular AC induction motor usually can be used as a generator, without any internal modifications. Because they can recover energy with relatively simple controls, induction generators are useful in applications such as mini hydro power plants, wind turbines, or in reducing high-pressure gas streams to lower pressure.

An induction generator draws reactive excitation current from an external source. Induction generators have an AC rotor and cannot bootstrap using residual magnetization to black start a de-energized distribution system as synchronous machines do. Power factor correcting capacitors can be added externally to neutralize a constant amount of the variable reactive excitation current. After starting, an induction generator can use a capacitor bank to produce reactive excitation current, but the isolated power system's voltage and frequency are not self-regulating and destabilize readily.

== Principle of operation ==
An induction generator produces electrical power when its rotor is turned faster than the synchronous speed. For a four-pole motor (two pairs of poles on stator) powered by a 60 Hz source, the synchronous speed is 1800 rotations per minute (rpm) and 1500 RPM powered at 50 Hz. The motor always turns slightly slower than the synchronous speed. The difference between synchronous and operating speed is called slip and is often expressed as per cent of the synchronous speed. For example, a motor operating at 1450 RPM that has a synchronous speed of 1500 RPM is running at a slip of +3.3%.

In operation as a motor, the stator flux rotation is at the synchronous speed, which is faster than the rotor speed. This causes the stator flux to cycle at the slip frequency inducing rotor current through the mutual inductance between the stator and rotor. The induced current create a rotor flux with magnetic polarity opposite to the stator. In this way, the rotor is dragged along behind stator flux, with the currents in the rotor induced at the slip frequency. The motor runs at the speed where the induced rotor current gives rise to torque equal to the shaft load.

In generator operation, a prime mover (turbine or engine) drives the rotor above the synchronous speed (negative slip). The stator flux induces current in the rotor, but the opposing rotor flux is now cutting the stator coils, a current is induced in the stator coils 270° behind the magnetizing current, in phase with magnetizing voltage. The motor delivers real (in-phase) power to the power system.

=== Excitation ===
Equivalent circuit of induction generator

An induction motor requires an externally supplied current to the stator windings in order to induce a current in the rotor. Because the current in an inductor is integral of the voltage with respect to time, for a sinusoidal voltage waveform the current lags the voltage by 90°, and the induction motor always consumes reactive power, regardless of whether it is consuming electrical power and delivering mechanical power as a motor or consuming mechanical power and delivering electrical power to the system.

A source of excitation current for magnetizing flux (reactive power) for the stator is still required, to induce rotor current. This can be supplied from the electrical grid or, once it starts producing power, from a capacitive reactance. The generating mode for induction motors is complicated by the need to excite the rotor, which being induced by an alternating current is demagnetized at shutdown with no residual magnetization to bootstrap a cold start. It is necessary to connect an external source of magnetizing current to initialize production. The power frequency and voltage are not self regulating. The generator is able to supply current out of phase with the voltage requiring more external equipment to build a functional isolated power system. Similar is the operation of the induction motor in parallel with a synchronous motor serving as a power factor compensator. A feature in the generator mode in parallel to the grid is that the rotor speed is higher than in the driving mode. Then active energy is being given to the grid. Another disadvantage of induction motor generator is that it consumes a significant magnetizing current I0 = (20-35)%.

=== Active power ===
Active power delivered to the line is proportional to slip above the synchronous speed. Full rated power of the generator is reached at very small slip values (motor dependent, typically 3%). At synchronous speed of 1800 RPM, generator will produce no power. When the driving speed is increased to 1860 RPM (typical example), full output power is produced. If the prime mover is unable to produce enough power to fully drive the generator, speed will remain somewhere between 1800 and 1860 RPM range.

=== Required capacitance ===
A capacitor bank must supply reactive power to the motor when used in stand-alone mode. The reactive power supplied should be equal to or greater than the reactive power that the generator normally draws when operating as a motor.

=== Torque vs. slip ===
The basic fundamental of induction generators is the conversion from mechanical energy to electrical energy. This requires an external torque applied to the rotor to turn it faster than the synchronous speed. However, indefinitely increasing torque doesn't lead to an indefinite increase in power generation. The rotating magnetic field torque excited from the armature works to counter the motion of the rotor and prevent over speed because of induced motion in the opposite direction. As the speed of the motor increases the counter torque reaches a max value of torque (breakdown torque) that it can operate until before the operating conditions become unstable. Ideally, induction generators work best in the stable region between the no-load condition and maximum torque region.

=== Rated current ===
The maximum power that can be produced by an induction motor operated as a generator is limited by the rated current of the generator's windings.

== Grid and stand-alone connections ==
Typical connections when used as a standalone generator

In induction generators, the reactive power required to establish the air gap magnetic flux is provided by a capacitor bank connected to the machine in case of stand-alone system and in case of grid connection it draws reactive power from the grid to maintain its air gap flux. For a grid-connected system, frequency and voltage at the machine will be dictated by the electric grid, since it is very small compared to the whole system. For stand-alone systems, frequency and voltage are complex function of machine parameters, capacitance used for excitation, and load value and type.

== Uses ==
Induction generators are often used in wind turbines and some micro hydro installations due to their ability to produce useful power at varying rotor speeds. Induction generators are mechanically and electrically simpler than other generator types. They are also more rugged, requiring no brushes or commutators.

== Limitations ==
An induction generator connected to a capacitor system can generate sufficient reactive power to operate independently. When the load current exceeds the capability of the generator to supply both magnetization reactive power and load power the generator will immediately cease to produce power. The load must be removed and the induction generator restarted with either an external DC motor or if present, residual magnetism in the core.

Induction generators are particularly suitable for wind generating stations as in this case speed is always a variable factor. Induction generators cannot be used alone for grid frequency control because they are load-dependent and do not inherently react to grid frequency deviations as synchronous generators do.

== Example application ==
As an example, consider the use of a 10 hp, 1760 r/min, 440 V, three-phase induction motor (a.k.a. induction electrical machine in an asynchronous generator regime) as asynchronous generator. The full-load current of the motor is 10 A and the full-load power factor is 0.8.

Required capacitance per phase if capacitors are connected in delta:

Apparent power $S = \sqrt{3} E I = 1.73 * 440 * 10 = 7612 VA$
Active power $P = S \cos(\theta) = 7612 * 0.8 = 6090 W$
Reactive power $Q = \sqrt{S^2-P^2} = 4567 VAR$

For a machine to run as an asynchronous generator, capacitor bank must supply minimum 4567 / 3 phases = 1523 VAR per phase. Voltage per capacitor is 440 V because capacitors are connected in delta.

Capacitive current Ic = Q/E = 1523/440 = 3.46 A
Capacitive reactance per phase Xc = E/Ic = 127 Ω

Minimum capacitance per phase:

C = 1 / (2*π*f*Xc) = 1 / (2 * 3.141 * 60 * 127) = 21 μF.

If the load also absorbs reactive power, capacitor bank must be increased in size to compensate.

Prime mover speed should be used to generate frequency of 60 Hz:

Typically, slip should be similar to full-load value when machine is running as motor, but negative (generator operation):

if Ns = 1800, one can choose N=Ns+40 rpm
Required prime mover speed N = 1800 + 40 = 1840 rpm.

== See also ==
- Doubly fed electric machine
- Electric generator
- Induction motor
