= Copper in renewable energy =

Renewable energy sources such as solar, wind, tidal, hydro, biomass, and geothermal have become significant sectors of the energy market. The rapid growth of these sources in the 21st century has been prompted by the increasing costs and environmental impact of fossil fuels, which has led to a proposed phase out of fossil fuel use.

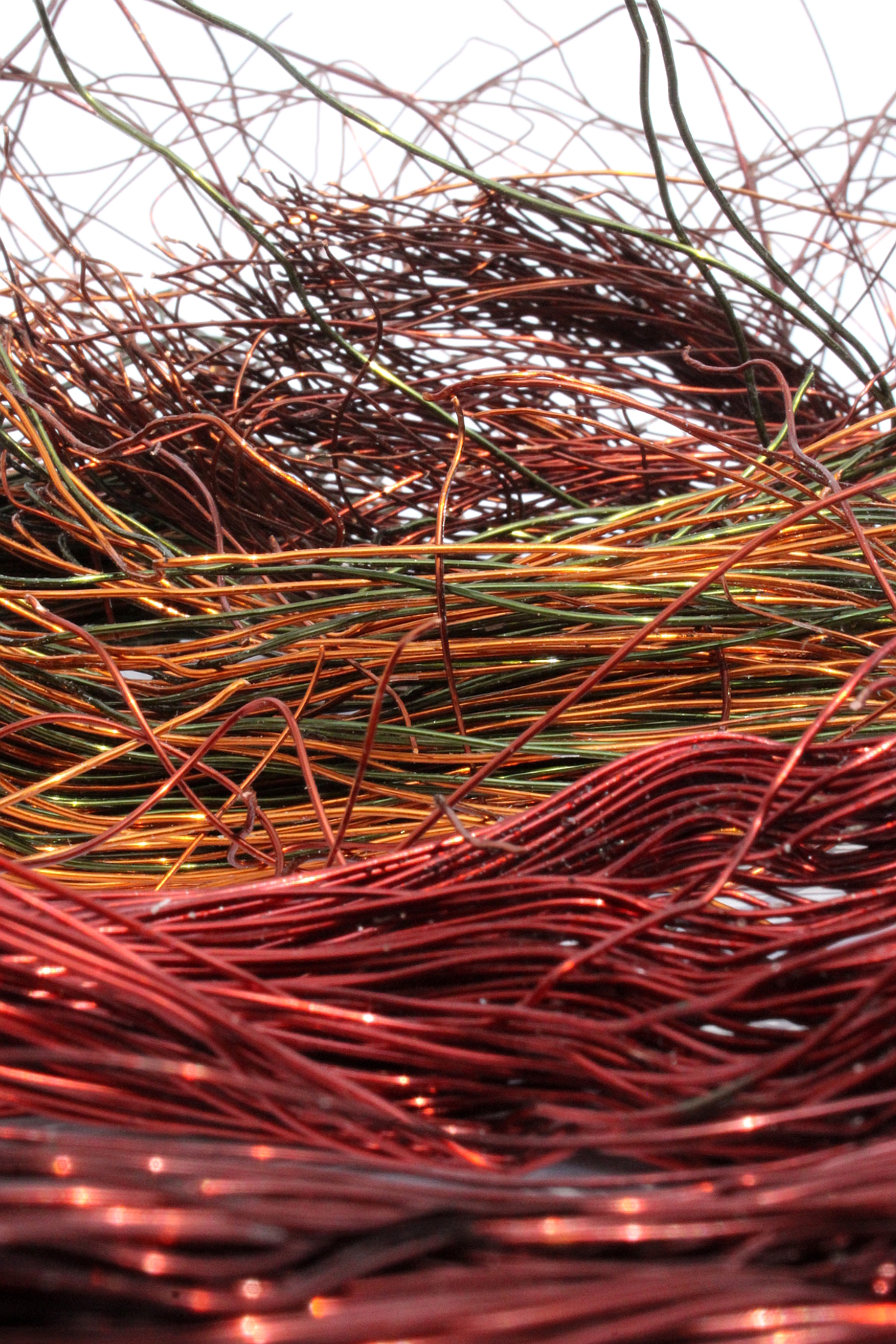
Copper wires for recycling

Copper plays an important role in these renewable energy systems, mainly for cables and pipes. Copper usage averages up to five times more in renewable energy systems than in traditional power generation, such as fossil fuel and nuclear power plants. Since copper is an excellent thermal and electrical conductor among engineering metals (second only to silver), electrical systems that utilize copper generate and transmit energy with high efficiency and with minimum environmental impacts.

When choosing electrical conductors, facility planners and engineers factor capital investment costs of materials against operational savings due to their electrical energy efficiencies over their useful lives, plus maintenance costs. Copper often fares well in these calculations. A factor called "copper usage intensity," is a measure of the quantity of copper necessary to install one megawatt of new power-generating capacity.

When planning for a new renewable power facility, engineers and product specifiers seek to avoid supply shortages of selected materials. According to the United States Geological Survey, in-ground copper reserves have increased more than 700% since 1950, from almost 100 million tonnes to 720 million tonnes in 2017, despite the fact that world refined usage has more than tripled in the last 50 years. Copper resources are estimated to exceed 5 Billion tonnes.

Bolstering the supply from copper extraction is the more than 30 percent of copper installed from 2007 to 2017 that came from recycled sources. Its recycling rate is higher than any other metal.

== Overview ==
The majority of copper usage, worldwide, is for electrical wiring, including the coils of generators and motors.

Copper plays a larger role in renewable energy generation than in conventional thermal power plants in terms of tonnage of copper per unit of installed power. The copper usage intensity of renewable energy systems is four to six times higher than in fossil fuel or nuclear plants. So for example, while conventional power requires approximately 1 tonne of copper per installed megawatt (MW), renewable technologies such as wind and solar require four to six times more copper per installed MW. This is because copper is spread over much larger land areas, particularly in solar and wind energy power plants. Power and grounding cables must run far to connect components that are widely dispersed, including to energy storage systems and to the main electrical grid.

Wind and solar photovoltaic energy systems have the highest copper content of all renewable energy technologies. A single wind farm can contain between 2000 and 7000 tons of copper. A photovoltaic solar power plant contains approximately 5.5 tons of copper per megawatt of power generation. A single 660-kW turbine is estimated to contain some 800 pounds (350 kg) of copper.

The total amount of copper used in renewable-based and distributed electricity generation in 2011 was estimated to be 272 kilotonnes (kt). Cumulative copper use through 2011 was estimated to be 1,071 kt.

Copper usage in renewable energy generation
	Installed power in 2011	Cumulative installed power to 2011	Copper use in 2011	Cumulative copper use to 2011
	Gigawatts (GW)	Gigawatts (GW)	Kilotons (kt)	Kilotons (kt)
Photovoltaics	30	70	150	350
Solar thermal electricity	0.46	1.76	2	7
Wind	40	238	120	714
Total for all three technologies			272	1071

Copper conductors are used in major electrical renewable energy components, such as turbines, generators, transformers, inverters, electrical cables, power electronics, and information cable. Copper usage is approximately the same in turbines/generators, transformers/inverters, and cables. Much less copper is used in power electronics.

Solar thermal heating and cooling energy systems rely on copper for their thermal energy efficiency benefits. Copper is also used as a special corrosion-resistant material in renewable energy systems in wet, humid, and saline corrosive environments.

Copper is a sustainable material that is 100% recyclable and has a higher recycling rate than any other metal. At the end of the useful life of equipment, its copper can be recycled with no loss of its beneficial properties.

== Solar photovoltaic power generation ==
There is eleven to forty times more copper per unit of generation in photovoltaic systems than in conventional fossil fuel plants. The usage of copper in photovoltaic systems averages around 4–5 tonnes per MW or higher if conductive ribbon strips that connect individual PV cells are considered.

Copper is used in:

- small wires that interconnect photovoltaic modules
- earthing grids in electrode earth pegs, horizontal plates, naked cables, and wires
- DC cables that connect photovoltaic modules to inverters
- low-voltage AC cables that connect inverters to metering systems and protection cabinets
- high-voltage AC cables
- communication cables
- inverters/power electronics
- ribbons
- transformer windings.

Copper used in photovoltaic systems in 2011 was estimated to be 150 kt. Cumulative copper usage in photovoltaic systems through 2011 was estimated to be 350 kt.

=== Photovoltaic system configurations ===
Solar photovoltaic (PV) systems are highly scalable, ranging from small rooftop systems to large photovoltaic power station with capacities of hundreds of megawatts. In residential systems, copper intensity appears to be linearly scalable with the capacity of the electrical generation system. Residential and community-based systems generally range in capacity from 10 kW to 1 MW.

PV cells are grouped together in solar modules. These modules are connected to panels and then into PV arrays. In grid-connected photovoltaic power system, arrays can form sub-fields from which electricity is collected and transported towards the grid connection.

Copper solar cables connect modules (module cable), arrays (array cable), and sub-fields (field cable). Whether a system is connected to the grid or not, electricity collected from the PV cells needs to be converted from DC to AC and stepped up in voltage. This is done by solar inverters which contain copper windings, as well as with copper-containing power electronics.

=== Solar cells ===
The photovoltaic industry uses several different semiconducting materials for the production of solar cells and often groups them into first and second generation technologies, while the third generation includes a number of emerging technologies that are still in the research and development phase. Solar cells typically convert 20% of incident sunlight into electricity, allowing the generation of 100–150 kWh per square meter of panel per year.

Conventional first-generation crystalline silicon (c-Si) technology includes monocrystalline silicon and polycrystalline silicon. In order to reduce costs of this wafer-based technology, copper-contacted silicon solar cells are emerging as an important alternative to silver as the preferred conductor material. Challenges with solar cell metallization lie in the creation of a homogenous and qualitatively high-value layer between silicon and copper to serves as a barrier against copper diffusion into the semiconductor. Copper-based front-side metallization in silicon solar cells is a significant step towards lower cost.

The second-generation technology includes thin film solar cells. Despite having a slightly lower conversion efficiency than conventional PV technology, the overall cost-per-watt is still lower. Commercially significant thin film technologies include copper indium gallium selenide solar cells (CIGS) and cadmium telluride photovoltaics (CdTe), while amorphous silicon (a-Si) and micromorphous silicon (m-Si) tandem cells are slowly being outcompeted in recent years.

CIGS, which is actually copper (indium-gallium) diselenide, or Cu(InGa)Se_{2}, differs from silicon in that it is a heterojunction semiconductor. It has the highest solar energy conversion efficiency (~20%) among thin film materials. Because CIGS strongly absorbs sunlight, a much thinner film is required than with other semiconductor materials.

A photovoltaic cell manufacturing process has been developed that makes it possible to print CIGS semi-conductors. This technology has the potential to reduce the price per solar watt delivered.

Mono-dispersed copper sulfide nanocrystals are being researched as alternatives to conventional single crystals and thin films for photovoltaic devices. This technology, which is still in its infancy, has potential for dye-sensitized solar cells, all-inorganic solar cells, and hybrid nano-crystal-polymer composite solar cells.

=== Cables ===
Solar generation systems cover large areas. There are many connections among modules and arrays, and connections among arrays in sub-fields and linkages to the network. Solar cables are used for wiring solar power plants. The amount of cabling involved can be substantial. Typical sizes of copper cables used are 4–6 mm^{2} for module cable, 6–10 mm^{2} for array cable, and 30–50 mm^{2} for field cable.

=== Energy efficiency and system design ===
Energy efficiency and renewable energy are twin pillars of a sustainable energy future. However, there is little linking of these pillars despite their potential synergies. The more efficiently energy services are delivered, the faster renewable energy can become an effective and significant contributor of primary energy. The more energy is obtained from renewable sources, the less fossil fuel energy is required to provide that same energy demand. This linkage of renewable energy with energy efficiency relies in part on the electrical energy efficiency benefits of copper.

Increasing the diameter of a copper cable increases its electrical energy efficiency (see: Copper wire and cable). Thicker cables reduce resistive (I^{2}R) loss, which affects lifetime profitability of PV system investments. Complex cost evaluations, factoring extra costs for materials, the amount of solar radiation directed towards solar modules per year (accounting for diurnal and seasonal variations, subsidies, tariffs, payback periods, etc.) are necessary to determine whether higher initial investments for thicker cables are justified.

Depending upon circumstances, some conductors in PV systems can be specified with either copper or aluminium. As with other electrical conducting systems, there are advantages to each (see: Copper wire and cable). Copper is the preferred material when high electrical conductivity characteristics and flexibility of the cable are of paramount importance. Also, copper is more suitable for small roof facilities, in smaller cable trays, and when ducting in steel or plastic pipes.

Cable ducting is not needed in smaller power facilities where copper cables are less than 25mm^{2}. Without duct work, installation costs are lower with copper than with aluminium.

Data communications networks rely on copper, optical fiber, and/or radio links. Each material has its advantages and disadvantages. Copper is more reliable than radio links. Signal attenuation with copper wires and cables can be resolved with signal amplifiers.

== Concentrating solar thermal power ==
Concentrating solar power (CSP), also known as solar thermal electricity (STE), uses arrays of mirrors that concentrate the sun's rays to temperatures between 400^{0}C and 1000^{0}C. Electrical power is produced when the concentrated light is converted to heat, which drives a heat engine (usually a steam turbine) connected to an electrical power generator.

A CSP system consists of: 1) a concentrator or collector containing mirrors that reflect solar radiation and deliver it to the receiver; 2) a receiver that absorbs concentrated sunlight and transfers heat energy to a working fluid (usually a mineral oil, or more rarely, molten salts, metals, steam or air); 3) a transport and storage system that passes the fluid from the receiver to the power conversion system; and 4) a steam turbine that converts thermal power to electricity on demand.

Copper is used in field power cables, grounding networks, and motors for tracking and pumping fluids, as well as in the main generator and high voltage transformers. Typically, there is about 200 tonnes copper for a 50 MW power plant.

It has been estimated that copper usage in concentrated solar thermal power plants was 2 kt in 2011. Cumulative copper usage in these plants through 2011 was estimated to be 7 kt.

There are four main types of CSP technologies, each containing a different amount of copper: parabolic trough plants, tower plants, distributed linear absorber systems including linear Fresnel plants, and dish Stirling plants. The use of copper in these plants is described here.

=== Parabolic trough plants ===
Parabolic trough plants are the most common CSP technology, representing about 94% of power installed in Spain. These plants collect solar energy in parabolic trough concentrators with linear collector tubes. The heat transfer fluids are typically synthetic oil that circulates through tubes at inlet outlet/temperatures of 300 °C to 400 °C. The typical storage capacity of a 50 MW facility is 7 hours at nominal power. A plant of this size and storage capacity can generate 160 GWh/year in a region like Spain.

In parabolic trough plants, copper is specified in the solar collector field (power cables, signals, earthing, electrical motors); steam cycle (water pumps, condenser fans, cabling to consumption points, control signal and sensors, motors), electricity generators (alternator, transformer), and storage systems (circulating pumps, cabling to consumption points). A 50 MW plant with 7.5 hours of storage contains approximately 196 tonnes of copper, of which 131,500 kg are in cables and 64,700 kg are in various equipment (generators, transformers, mirrors, and motors). This translates to about 3.9 tonnes/MW, or, in other terms, 1.2 tonnes/GWh/year. A plant of the same size without storage can have 20% less copper in the solar field and 10% less in the electronic equipment. A 100 MW plant will have 30% less relative copper content per MW in the solar field and 10% less in electronic equipment.

Copper quantities also vary according to design. The solar field of a typical 50 MW power plant with 7 hours of storage capacity consists of 150 loops and 600 motors, while a similar plant without storage uses 100 loops and 400 motors. Motorized valves for mass flow control in the loops rely on more copper. Mirrors use a small amount of copper to provide galvanic corrosion protection to the reflective silver layer. Changes in the size of the plants, size of collectors, efficiencies of heat transfer fluids will also affect material volumes.

=== Tower plants ===
Tower plants, also called central tower power plants, may become the preferred CSP technology in the future. They collect solar energy concentrated by the heliostat field in a central receiver mounted at the top of the tower. Each heliostat tracks the Sun along two axes (azimuth and elevation). Therefore, two motors per unit are required.

Copper is required in the heliostat field (power cables, signal, earthing, motors), receiver (trace heating, signal cables), storage system (circulating pumps, cabling to consumption points), electricity generation (alternator, transformer), steam cycle (water pumps, condenser fans), cabling to consumption points, control signal and sensors, and motors.

A 50 MW solar tower facility with 7.5 hours of storage uses about 219 tonnes of copper. This translates to 4.4 tonnes of copper/MW, or, in other terms, 1.4 tonnes/GWh/year. Of this amount, cables account for approximately 154,720 kg. Electronic equipment, such as generators, transformers, and motors, account for approximately 64,620 kg of copper. A 100 MW plant has slightly more copper per MW in the solar field because the efficiency of the heliostat field diminishes with the size. A 100 MW plant will have somewhat less copper per MW in process equipment.

=== Linear Fresnel plants ===
Linear Fresnel plants use linear reflectors to concentrate the Sun's rays in an absorber tube similar to parabolic trough plants. Since the concentration factor is less than in parabolic trough plants, the temperature of the heat transfer fluid is lower. This is why most plants use saturated steam as the working fluid in both the solar field and the turbine.

A 50 MW linear Fresnel power plant requires about 1,960 tracking motors. The power required for each motor is much lower than the parabolic trough plant. A 50 MW lineal Fresnel plant without storage will contain about 127 tonnes of copper. This translates to 2.6 tonnes of copper/MW, or in other terms, 1.3 tonnes of copper/GWh/year. Of this amount, 69,960 kg of copper are in cables from process area, solar field, earthing and lightning protection and controls. Another 57,300 kg of copper is in equipment (transformers, generators, motors, mirrors, pumps, fans).

=== Dish Stirling plants ===
These plants are an emerging technology that has potential as a solution for decentralized applications. The technology does not require water for cooling in the conversion cycle. These plants are non-dispatchable. Energy production ceases when clouds pass overhead. Research is being conducted on advanced storage and hybridization systems.

The largest dish Sterling installation has a total power of 1.5 MW. Relatively more copper is needed in the solar field than other CSP technologies because electricity is actually generated there. Based on existing 1.5 MW plants, the copper content is 4 tonnes/MW, or, in other terms, 2.2 tonnes of copper/GWh/year. A 1.5 MW power plant has some 6,060 kg of copper in cables, induction generators, drives, field and grid transformers, earthing and lightning protection.

== Solar water heaters (solar domestic hot water systems) ==
Solar water heaters can be a cost-effective way to generate hot water for homes. They can be used in any climate. The fuel they use, sunshine, is free.

Solar hot water collectors are used by more than 200 million households as well as many public and commercial buildings worldwide. The total installed capacity of solar thermal heating and cooling units in 2010 was 185 GW-thermal.

Solar heating capacity increased by an estimated 27% in 2011 to reach approximately 232 GWth, excluding unglazed swimming pool heating. Most solar thermal is used for water heating, but solar space heating and cooling are gaining ground, particularly in Europe.

There are two types of solar water heating systems: active, which have circulating pumps and controls, and passive, which don't. Passive solar techniques do not require working electrical or mechanical elements. They include the selection of materials with favorable thermal properties, designing spaces that naturally circulate air, and referencing the position of a building to the Sun.

Copper is an important component of solar thermal heating and cooling systems because of its high heat conductivity, resistance to atmospheric and water corrosion, sealing and joining by soldering, and mechanical strength. Copper is used both in receivers and primary circuits (pipes and heat exchangers for water tanks). For the absorber plate, aluminium is sometimes used as it is cheaper, yet when combined with copper piping, there may be problems in regards to allow the absorber plate to transfer its heat to the piping suitably. An alternative material that is currently used is PEX-AL-PEX but there may be similar problems with the heat transfer between the absorber plate and the pipes as well. One way around this is to simply use the same material for both the piping and the absorber plate. This material can be copper off course but also aluminium or PEX-AL-PEX.

Three types of solar thermal collectors are used for residential applications: flat plate collectors, integral collector-storage, and solar thermal collector: Evacuated tube collectors; They can be direct circulation (i.e., heats water and brings it directly to the home for use) or indirect circulation (i.e., pumps heat a transfer fluid through a heat exchanger, which then heats water that flows into the home) systems.

In an evacuated tube solar hot water heater with an indirect circulation system, evacuated tubes contain a glass outer tube and metal absorber tube attached to a fin. Solar thermal energy is absorbed within the evacuated tubes and is converted into usable concentrated heat. Copper heat pipes transfer thermal energy from within the solar tube into a copper header. A thermal transfer fluid (water or glycol mixture) is pumped through the copper header. As the solution circulates through the copper header, the temperature rises. The evacuated glass tubes have a double layer. The outer layer is fully transparent to allow solar energy to pass through unimpeded. The inner layer is treated with a selective optical coating that absorbs energy without reflection. The inner and outer layers are fused at the end, leaving an empty space between the inner and outer layers. All air is pumped out of the space between the two layers (evacuation process), thereby creating the thermos effect which stops conductive and convective transfer of heat that might otherwise escape into the atmosphere. Heat loss is further reduced by the low-emissivity of the glass that is used. Inside the glass tube is the copper heat pipe. It is a sealed hollow copper tube that contains a small amount of proprietary liquid, which under low pressure boils at a very low temperature. Other components include a solar heat exchanger tank and a solar pumping station, with pumps and controllers.

== Wind ==
In a wind turbine, the wind's kinetic energy is converted into mechanical energy to drive a generator, which in turn generates electricity. The basic components of a wind power system consist of a tower with rotating blades containing an electricity generator and a transformer to step up voltage for electricity transmission to a substation on the grid. Cabling and electronics are also important components.

The harsh environment offshore wind farms means that the individual components need to be more rugged and corrosion protected than their onshore components. Increasingly long connections to shore with subsea MV and HV cables are required at this time. The need for corrosion protection favors copper nickel cladding as the preferred alloy for the towers.

Copper is an important conductor in wind power generation. Wind farms can contain several hundred-thousand feet of copper weighing between 4 million to 15 million pounds, mostly in wiring, cable, tubing, generators and step-up transformers.

Copper usage intensity is high because turbines in wind generation farms are spread over large areas. In land-based wind farms, copper intensity can range between 5,600 and 14,900 pounds per MW, depending on whether the step-up transformers have copper or aluminium conductors. In the off-shore environment, copper intensity is much higher: approximately 21,000 pounds per MW, which includes submarine cables to shore. In both onshore and offshore environments, additional copper cabling is used to connect wind farms to main electrical grids.

The amount of copper used for wind energy systems in 2011 was estimated to be 120 kt. The cumulative amount of copper installed through 2011 was estimated to be 714 kt. As of 2018, global production of wind turbines use 450,000 tonnes of copper per year.

For wind farms with three-stage gearbox doubly fed 3 MW induction generators, approximately 2.7 t per MW is needed with standard wind turbines. For wind turbines with LV/MV transformers in the nacelle, 1.85 t per MW is needed.

Copper is primarily used in coil windings in the stator and rotor portions of generators (which convert mechanical energy into electrical energy), in high voltage and low voltage cable conductors including the vertical electrical cable that connects the nacelle to the base of the wind turbine, in the coils of transformers (which steps up low voltage AC to high voltage AC compatible with the grid), in gearboxes (which convert the slow revolutions per minute of the rotor blades to faster rpms) and in wind farm electrical grounding systems. Copper may also be used in the nacelle (the housing of the wind turbine that rests on the tower containing all the main components), auxiliary motors (motors used to rotate the nacelle as well as control the angle of the rotor blades), cooling circuits (cooling configuration for the entire drive train), and power electronics (which enable the wind turbine systems to perform like a power plant).

In the coils of wind generators, electric current suffers from losses that are proportional to the resistance of the wire that carries the current. This resistance, called copper losses, causes energy to be lost by heating up the wire. In wind power systems, this resistance can be reduced with thicker copper wire and with a cooling system for the generator, if required.

=== Copper in generators ===
Either copper or aluminium conductors can be specified for generator cables. Copper has the higher electrical conductivity and therefore the higher electrical energy efficiency. It is also selected for its safety and reliability. The main consideration for specifying aluminium is its lower capital cost. Over time, this benefit is offset by higher energy losses over years of power transmission. Deciding which conductor to use is determined during a project's planning phase when utility teams discuss these matters with turbine and cable manufacturers.

Regarding copper, its weight in a generator will vary according to the type of generator, power rating, and configuration. Its weight has an almost linear relationship to the power rating.

Generators in direct-drive wind turbines usually contain more copper, as the generator itself is bigger due to the absence of a gearbox.

A generator in a direct drive configuration could be 3.5 times to 6 times heavier than in a geared configuration, depending on the type of generator.

Five different types of generator technologies are used in wind generation:

1. double-fed asynchronous generators (DFAG)
2. conventional asynchronous generators (CAG)
3. conventional synchronous generators (CSG)
4. permanent magnet synchronous generators (PMSG)
5. high-temperature superconductor generators (HTSG)

The amount of copper in each of these generator types is summarized here.

Copper in wind turbine generator technologies in multi-megawatt wind power plants
Technology	Average copper content (kg/MW)	Notes
Double-fed asynchronous generator (DFAG)	650	Geared; most common wind generator in Europe (70% in 2009; strong demand until 2015, then neutral as high cost of maintenance and servicing and need for power correction equipment for grid compliance will make these less popular in next ten years.
Conventional asynchronous generators (CAG)	390	Geared; neutral demand until 2015; will become negligible by 2020.
Conventional synchronous generators (CSG)	330–4000	Geared and direct; may become more popular by 2020.
Permanent magnet synchronous generators (PMSG)	600–2150	Market expected to develop by 2015.
High-temperature superconductor generators (HTSG)	325	Nascent stage of development. It is expected that these machines will attain more power than other WTGs. Offshore could be the most suitable niche application.

Direct-drive configurations of the synchronous type machines usually contain the most copper, but some use aluminium. Conventional synchronous generators (CSG) direct-drive machines have the highest per-unit copper content. The share of CSGs will increase from 2009 to 2020, especially for direct drive machines. DFAGs accounted for the most unit sales in 2009.

The variation in the copper content of CSG generators depends upon whether they are coupled with single-stage (heavier) or three-stage (lighter) gearboxes. Similarly, the difference in copper content in PMSG generators depends on whether the turbines are medium speed, which are heavier, or high-speed turbines, which are lighter.

There is increasing demand for synchronous machines and direct-drive configurations. CSG direct and geared DFAGs will lead the demand for copper. The highest growth in demand is expected to be the direct PMSGs, which is forecast to account for 7.7% of the total demand for copper in wind power systems in 2015. However, since permanent magnets that contain the rare earth element neodymium may not be able to escalate globally, direct drive synchronous magnet (DDSM) designs may be more promising. The amount of copper required for a 3 MW DDSM generator is 12.6 t.

Locations with high-speed turbulent winds are better suited for variable-speed wind turbine generators with full-scale power converters due to the greater reliability and availability they offer in such conditions. Of the variable-speed wind turbine options, PMSGs could be preferred over DFAGs in such locations. In conditions with low wind speed and turbulence, DFAGs could be preferred to PMSGs.

Generally, PMSGs deal better with grid-related faults and they could eventually offer higher efficiency, reliability, and availability than geared counterparts. This could be achieved by reducing the number of mechanical components in their design. Currently, however, geared wind turbine generators have been more thoroughly field-tested and are less expensive due to the greater volumes produced.

The current trend is for PMSG hybrid installations with a single-stage or two-stage gearbox. The most recent wind turbine generator by Vestas is geared drive. The most recent wind turbine generator by Siemens is a hybrid. Over the medium term, if the cost of power electronics continues to decrease, direct-drive PMSG are expected to become more attractive. High-temperature superconductors (HTSG) technology is currently under development. It is expected that these machines will be able to attain more power than other wind turbine generators. If the offshore market follows the trend of larger unit machines, offshore could be the most suitable niche for HTSGs.

=== Copper in other components ===
For a 2 MW turbine system, the following amounts of copper were estimated for components other than the generator:

Copper Content by other Component Types, 2 MW turbine
Component	Average Cu content (kg)
Auxiliary motors (pitch and yaw drives)	75
Other parts of the nacelle	<50
Vertical cables	1500
Power electronics (converter)	150
Cooling circuits	<10
Earthing and lightning protection	750

Cabling is the second largest copper-containing component after the generator. A wind tower system with the transformer next to the generator will have medium-voltage (MV) power cables running from the top to the bottom of the tower, then to a collection point for a number of wind towers and on to the grid substation, or direct to the substation. The tower assembly will incorporate wire harnesses and control/signal cables, while low-voltage (LV) power cables are required to power the working parts throughout the system.

For a 2 MW wind turbine, the vertical cable could range from 1,000 to 1,500 kg of copper, depending upon its type. Copper is the dominant material in underground cables.

=== Copper in grounding systems ===
Copper is vital to the electrical grounding system for wind turbine farms. Grounding systems can either be all-copper (solid or stranded copper wires and copper bus bars) often with an American gauge rating of 4/0 but perhaps as large as 250 thousands of circular mils or copper-clad steel, a lower cost alternative.

Turbine masts attract lightning strikes, so they require lightning protection systems. When lightning strikes a turbine blade, current passes along the blade, through the blade hub in the nacelle (gearbox/ generator enclosure) and down the mast to a grounding system. The blade incorporates a large cross-section copper conductor that runs along its length and allows current to pass along the blade without deleterious heating effects. The nacelle is protected by a lightning conductor, often copper. The grounding system, at the base of the mast, consists of a thick copper ring conductor bonded to the base or located within a meter of the base. The ring is attached to two diametrically opposed points on the mast base. Copper leads extend outward from the ring and connect to copper grounding electrodes. The grounding rings at turbines on wind farms are inter-connected, providing a networked system with an extremely small aggregate resistance.

Solid copper wire has been traditionally deployed for grounding and lightning equipment due to its excellent electrical conductivity. However, manufacturers are moving towards less expensive bi-metal copper clad or aluminium grounding wires and cables. Copper-plating wire is being explored. Current disadvantages of copper plated wire include lower conductivity, size, weight, flexibility and current carrying capability.

=== Copper in other equipment ===
After generators and cable, minor amounts of copper are used in the remaining equipment. In yaw and pitch auxiliary motors, the yaw drive uses a combination of induction motors and multi-stage planetary gearboxes with minor amounts of copper. Power electronics have minimal amounts of copper compared to other equipment. As turbine capacities increase, converter ratings also increase from low voltage (<1 kV) to medium voltage (1–5 kV). Most wind turbines have full power converters, which have the same power rating as the generator, except the DFAG that has a power converter that is 30% of the rating of the generator. Finally, minor amounts of copper are used in air/oil and water cooled circuits on gearboxes or generators.

Class 5 copper power cabling is exclusively used from the generator through the loop and tower interior wall. This is due to its ability to withstand the stress from 15,000 torsion cycles for 20 years of service life.

Superconducting materials are being tested within and outside of wind turbines. They offer higher electrical efficiencies, the ability to carry higher currents, and lighter weights. These materials are, however, much more expensive than copper at this time.

=== Copper in offshore wind farms ===
The amount of copper in offshore wind farms increases with the distance to the coast. Copper usage in offshore wind turbines is on the order of 10.5 t per MW. The Borkum 2 offshore wind farm uses 5,800 t for a 400 MW, 200 kilometer connection to the external grid, or approximately 14.5 t of copper per MW. The Horns Rev Offshore Wind Farm uses 8.75 tons of copper per MW to transmit 160 MW 21 kilometers to the grid.
