= Pump-areometer =

Hydrometer credited to Floris Nollet

The Pump-areometer was an early hydrometer (a variant of the syphon-hydrometer), credited to Floris Nollet.

== Principle ==
The principle is an inverted glass tube with one leg in each of two liquids, the upper end being connected to a pump. Once sufficient air is removed from the pipe, the liquids rise in both legs, in inverse proportion to their density. If the density of one liquid is known, that of the other can be simply calculated. A reasonably wide tube is used to minimise the effects of capillary attraction.

More sophisticated "four leg" variants could eliminate the capillary effect on the calculation.

== See also ==
- Specific gravity
