= Auguste de Méritens =

French electrical engineer (1834–1898)

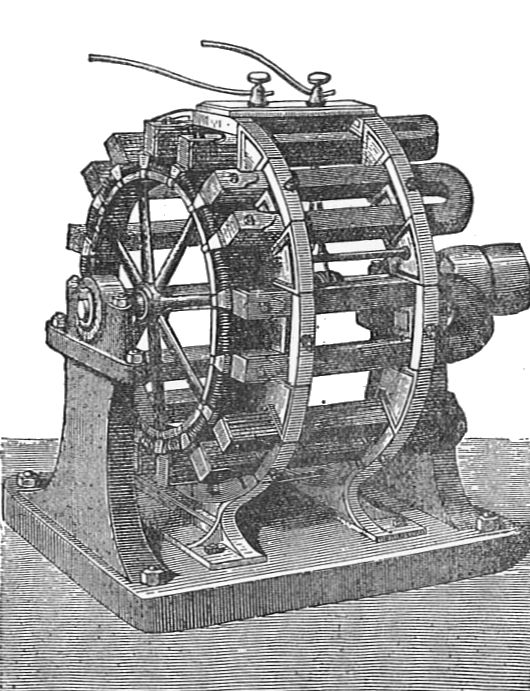
de Méritens lighthouse generator

Baron Auguste de Méritens (1834 – October 1898) was a French electrical engineer of the 19th century.

== Work on improving the magneto generators ==
He is best known for his work on magneto generators, particularly those used for arc lighting and lighthouses. Similar magneto generators had been produced earlier by Floris Nollet; de Méritens' innovation was to replace the rotor coils previously wound on individual bobbins, with a 'ring wound' armature. These windings were wound on a segmented iron core, similar to a Gramme ring, so as to form a single continuous hoop. This gave a more even output current, which was advantageous for use with arc lamps.

== Patent for arc welding ==
In 1881 he was awarded a French patent for the first arc welding process. This used a carbon electrode to generate an arc to the workpiece. The process achieved relatively low temperatures and was not successful with steel. However it was widely used commercially, for welding lead plates to manufacture storage batteries. De Méritens produced this welding equipment with an enclosed hood and fume extraction pipe, to control the hazardous lead oxide fumes from the hot lead.

== Bankruptcy and suicide by poison ==
He poisoned himself after having run bankrupt at Eragny-sur-Oise in the last days of October 1898.

== Patents ==
- 10 April 1878, French patent no. 123,766 (improved magneto-electric generator).
- 17 September 1878, British patent no. 3,658 (improved magneto-electric generator).
- 1881, French patent (electric arc welding)
