= Generation expansion planning =

Generation expansion planning (also known as GEP) is finding an optimal solution for the planning problem in which the installation of new generation units satisfies both technical and financial limits. GEP is a challenging problem because of the large scale, long-term and nonlinear nature of generation unit size. Due to lack of information, companies have to solve this problem in a risky environment because the competition between generation companies for maximizing their benefit make them to conceal their strategies. Under such an ambiguous condition, various nonlinear solutions have been proposed to solve this sophisticated problem. These solutions are based on different strategies including: game theory, two-level game model, multi-agent system, genetic algorithm, particle swarm optimization and so forth.

== See also ==
- Demand response
- power system
