= Floris Nollet =

Belgian physicist, engineer and inventor

- Born: 16 September 1794
- Died: 11 January 1853 (aged 58)

Floris Nollet (French: [flɔʁis nɔlɛ]; 16 September 1794 – 11 January 1853) was a Belgian physicist, engineer, and inventor.

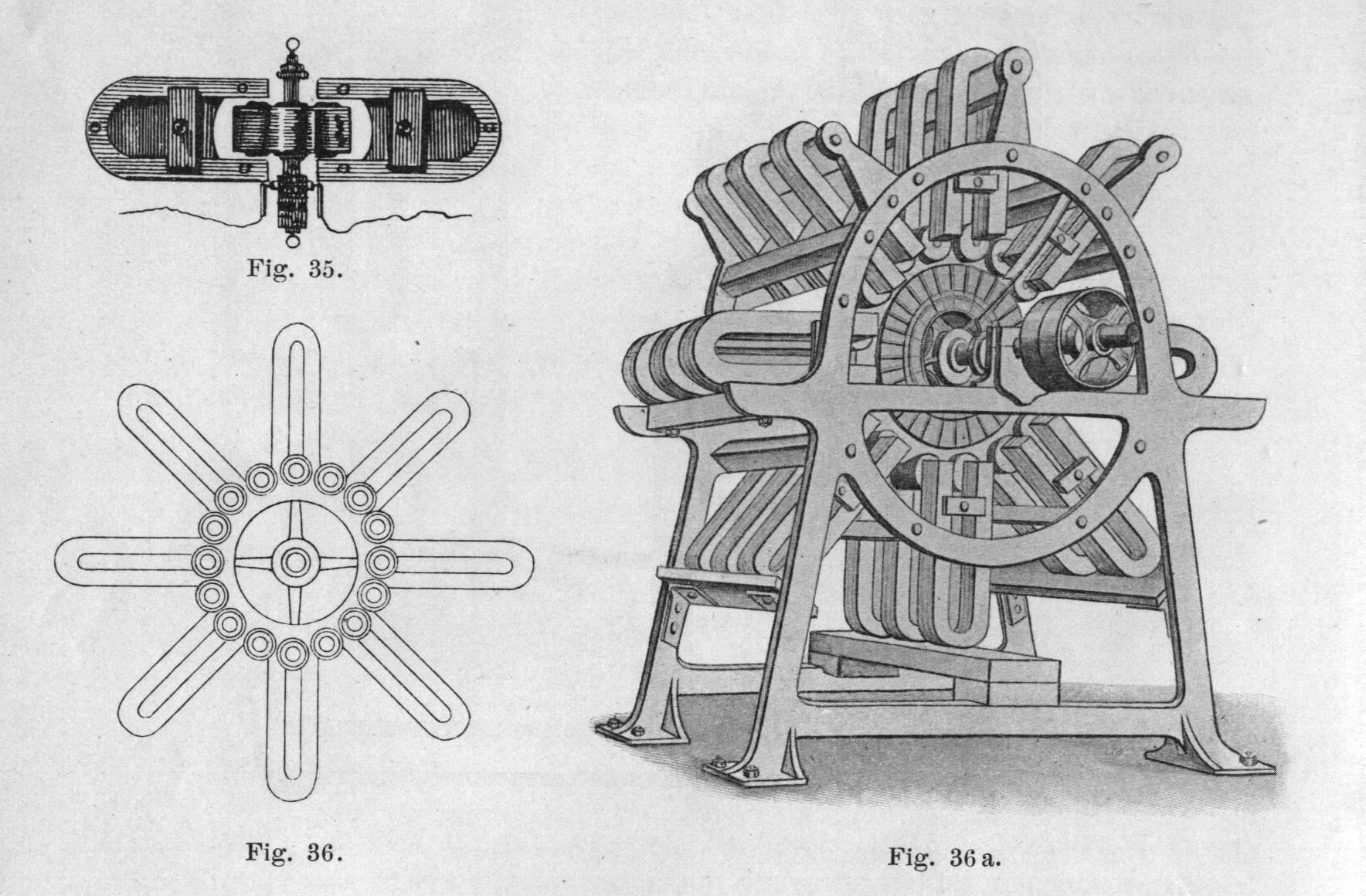
Nollet's Generator.

Nollet was a grandnephew of Jean-Antoine Nollet. He became professor of physics at the École Militaire in Brussels. He also founded the British-French company Société de l'Alliance.

Nollet designed plans for large-scale generators for the galvanization industry, for limelight, and for electric arcs, an improvement on the work of Hippolyte Pixii. His magneto-electric generator design for decomposing water by electrolysis using steam power was patented in England in 1850.
