= Permanent magnet synchronous generator =

Electrical equipment

A permanent magnet synchronous generator is a generator where the excitation field is provided by a permanent magnet instead of a coil. The term synchronous refers here to the fact that the rotor and magnetic field rotate with the same speed, because the magnetic field is generated through a shaft-mounted permanent magnet mechanism, and current is induced into the stationary armature.

== Description ==
Synchronous generators are the majority source of commercial electrical energy. They are commonly used to convert the mechanical power output of steam turbines, gas turbines, reciprocating engines, and hydro turbines into electrical power for the grid. Some designs of wind turbines also use this generator type.

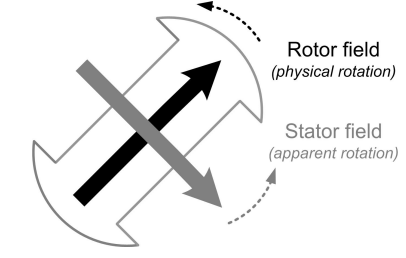

In the majority of designs, the rotating assembly in the center of the generator—the rotor—contains the magnet, and the stator is the stationary armature that is electrically connected to a load. As shown in the diagram, the perpendicular component of the stator field affects the torque while the parallel component affects the voltage. The load supplied by the generator determines the voltage. If the load is inductive, then the angle between the rotor and stator fields will be greater than 90°, which corresponds to an increased generator voltage. This is known as an overexcited generator. The opposite is true for a generator supplying a capacitive load, which is known as an underexcited generator.

A set of three conductors make up the armature winding in standard utility equipment, constituting three phases of a power circuit. The phases are wound such that they are 120° apart spatially on the stator, providing for a uniform force or torque on the rotor. The uniformity of the torque arises because the magnetic fields resulting from the induced currents in the three conductors of the armature winding combine spatially in such a way as to resemble the magnetic field of a single, rotating magnet. This stator magnetic field stator field appears as a steady rotating field and spins at the same frequency as the rotor when the rotor contains a single dipole magnetic field. The two fields move in synchronicity and maintain a fixed position relative to each other as they spin.

== Synchronous ==
They are known as synchronous generators because the frequency of the induced voltage in the stator (armature conductors) is directly proportional to the rotation rate of the rotor (or angular speed). If the rotor windings are arranged in such a way as to produce the effect of more than two magnetic poles, then each physical revolution of the rotor results in more magnetic poles moving past the armature windings. Each passing of a north and south pole corresponds to a complete "cycle" of a magnet field oscillation. Therefore, the constant of proportionality is $\frac{\text{P}}{120}$, where P is the number of magnetic rotor poles (almost always an even number), and the factor of 120 comes from 60 seconds per minute and two poles in a single magnet:

$f \left(\text{Hz}\right)=RPM\frac{\text{P}}{120}.$

== RPM and torque ==
The power in the prime mover is a function of RPM and torque: $P_m=T_m \cdot RPM$, where $P_m$ is mechanical power in Watts, $T_m$ is the torque with units of $\frac{N\cdot m}{rad}$, and RPM is the rotations per minute which is multiplied by a factor of $\frac{2\pi}{60}$ to give units of $\frac{Radians}{Sec}$. By increasing the torque on the prime mover, a larger electrical power output can be generated.

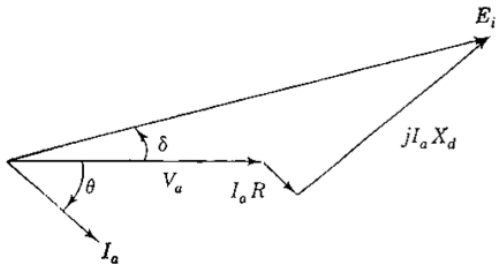

In practice, the typical load is inductive in nature. The diagram above depicts such an arrangement. $E_i$ is the voltage of the generator, $V_a$ and $I_a$ are the voltage and the current in the load respectively, and $\theta$ is the angle between them. Here, we can see that the resistance, R, and the reactance, $X_d$, play a role in determining the angle $\delta$. This information can be used to determine the real and reactive power output from the generator.

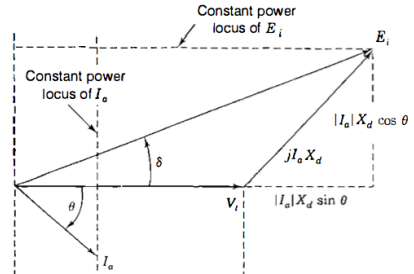

In this diagram, $V_t$ is the terminal voltage. If we ignore the resistance as shown above, we find that the power can be calculated:

$I_a=\frac{|E_i|\angle \delta -|V_t|}{jX_d}$$S=P+jQ=V_t I^\star=\frac{|V_t||E_i|\angle (-\delta) -|V_t|^2}{-jX_d}=\frac{|V_t||E_i|(cos (\delta)-jsin (\delta)) -|V_t|^2}{-jX_d}$

Breaking the apparent power into Real and Reactive power, we get:

$P=\frac{|V_t||E_i|}{X_d}sin (\delta),$ $Q=\frac{|V_t|}{X_d}(|E_i|cos (\delta) - |V_t|)$

== Applications ==
Permanent magnet generators (PMGs) or alternators (PMAs) do not require a DC supply for the excitation circuit, nor do they have slip rings and contact brushes. A key disadvantage in PMAs or PMGs is that the air gap flux is not controllable, so the voltage of the machine cannot be easily regulated. A persistent magnetic field imposes safety issues during assembly, field service, and repair. High-performance permanent magnets, themselves, have structural and thermal issues. Torque current MMF vectorially combines with the persistent flux of permanent magnets, which leads to higher air-gap flux density and eventually core saturation. In the permanent magnet alternators, the output voltage is directly proportional to the speed.

For small pilot generators used for speed measurement, voltage regulation may not be required. Where a permanent magnet generator is used to supply excitation current to the rotor of a larger machine on the same shaft, some external control is required for excitation current control and voltage regulation of the main machine. This may be done with slip rings connecting the rotating system to external control circuits, or by control through power electronic devices mounted on the rotating system and controlled externally.

== See also ==
- Alternator
- Magneto
- Ignition magneto
- Telephone magneto
