= Hippolyte Pixii =

French instrument maker (1808–1835)

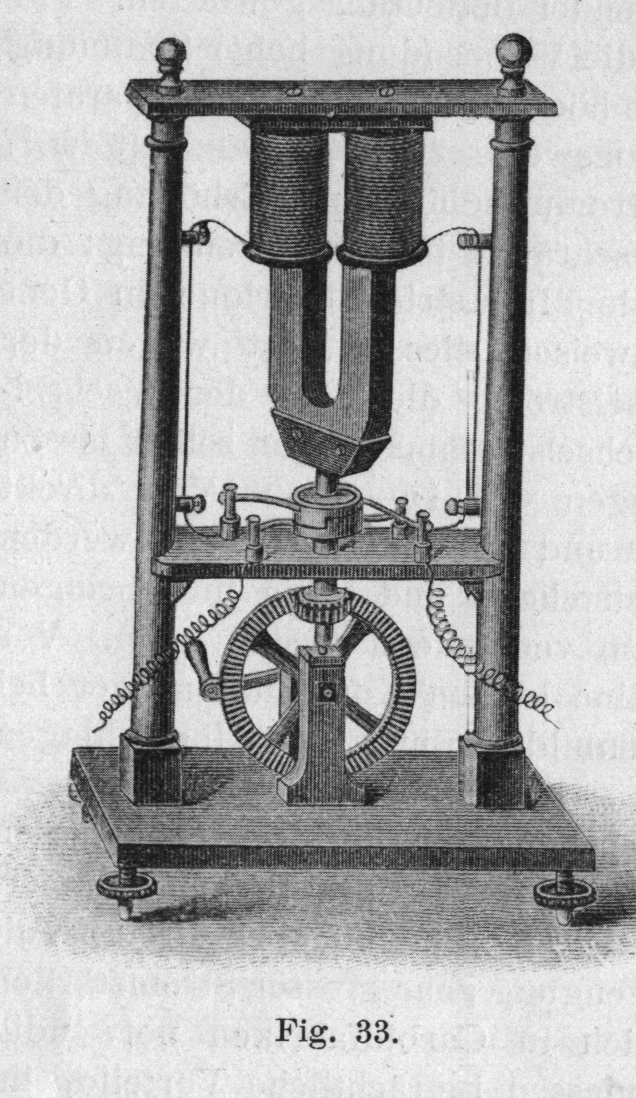
An early alternating current electrical generator (magneto) built by Pixii

Hippolyte Pixii (1808–1835) was an instrument maker from Paris, France. In 1832, he built an early form of alternating current electrical generator, based on the principle of electromagnetic induction discovered by Michael Faraday.

Pixii's device was a spinning magnet, operated by a hand crank, where the north and south poles passed over a coil with an iron core, and thus classified as a magneto. A current pulse was produced each time a pole passed over the coil. He also found that the current direction changed when the north pole passed over the coil after the south pole. Later, acting on a suggestion by André-Marie Ampère, other results were obtained by introducing a commutator which produced a pulsating direct current. At that time, direct current was preferable to alternating current.

Although Pixii did not fully understand electromagnetic induction, his device led to more sophisticated devices being constructed. A reproduction of Pixii's electrical generator is on display at the Ampère Museum, close to Lyon.

== See also ==
- Alternating current
