= Thyristor power controller =

Thyristor power controllers or silicon controlled rectifier power controllers (SCR power controllers) control power or voltage supplied to a load. Typical applications are generally found where power needs to be varied and ultimately converted into thermal energy. For example, the controllers are used in industrial furnace construction and in plastic processing.

== How it works ==
Thyristor power controllers are operated with an alternating voltage in single-phase or three-phase. They are controlled by a controller and vary the activation time of the mains voltage for the load.

Where the operating conditions allow, the pulse group operation is recommended. Here, whole mains voltage shafts are switched to the load or blocked. For example, a controller requires 60% output (via a 4–20 mA signal, which corresponds to 0-100%). The thyristor power controller switches 60% of the solid waves to the load while blocking 40%. The operating mode is to be regarded as unproblematic. Only in the case of a too weakly designed network, it is possible for illuminating installations which are connected to the same network to have undesired luminance fluctuations (flicker effect).

Some operating conditions require switching in each half-wave and thus very fast operation. Examples are control sections with very fast behavior or a required current limitation with low element resistance in the cold state. In this operating mode, the controller changes the phase angle α of the thyristor ignition timing. A half wave corresponds to 180 ° el. (electrical degree). The actuator can adjust the phase angle of 0 ° el. (maximum power) up to 180 ° el. (no power). In a 50 Hz mains the controller switches every 20 ms and shows very fast behavior. As a result of the voltage flanks during switch-on, disadvantages such as EMC interference potential or control voltage output also result in ohmic loads. This situation must be counteracted by means of line filters or the corresponding plant size with compensating systems.

== Underlying control ==
The controllers change their on-off ratio due to the degree of regulation. With a required output of 50%, the controller would switch off a full wave and a full wave in the pulse group mode. Only in the light of this situation, changes in output voltage fluctuate during mains voltage fluctuations. In fact, the operators have a subordinate regulation. In the most complex case, they vary the output power proportionally to the degree of regulation. For mains voltage changes, the controllers react with the variation of the switch-on and switch-off ratio.

== Monitoring of heating elements ==
In addition to the current limitation, thyristor power controllers offer additional functionalities for monitoring and / or protecting the elements: Heating elements are often operated in parallel. The partial breakage monitoring signals the breakage of a heating element. The heating element can be replaced at the next plant shutdown. R-Control limits the temperature of temperature-sensitive heating elements. Most of the heating elements are thermistors, they increase the resistance with the temperature. At a maximum permissible temperature, the heating element has a defined resistance, which is defined on the actuator. The output power is limited by the actuator and the maximum permissible temperature is not exceeded.
