= Polyphase system =

Means of distributing alternating-current electrical power

One voltage cycle of a three-phase system

A polyphase system (the term coined by Silvanus Thompson) is a means of distributing alternating-current (AC) electrical power that utilizes more than one AC phase, which refers to the phase offset value (in degrees) between AC in multiple conducting wires; phases may also refer to the corresponding terminals and conductors, as in color codes. Polyphase systems have two or more energized electrical conductors carrying alternating currents with a defined phase between the voltage waves in each conductor. Early systems used 4 wire two-phase with a 90° phase angle, but modern systems almost universally use three-phase voltage, with a phase angle of 120° (or 2π/3 radians).

Polyphase systems are particularly useful for transmitting power to electric motors which rely on alternating current to rotate. Three-phase power is used for industrial applications and for power transmission. Compared to a single-phase, two-wire system, a three-phase three-wire system transmits three times as much power for the same conductor size and voltage, using only 1.5 times as many conductors, making it twice as efficient in conductor utilization. Also, symmetric polyphase motors such as three-phase motors will draw a constant power and provide constant torque, while a single-phase motor will draw a pulsating power and provide pulsating torque with an associate vibration.

Systems with more than three phases are often used for rectifier and power conversion systems, and have been studied for power transmission.

== Number of phases ==
In the very early days of commercial electric power, transmission systems used multiple wires primarily to avoid the safety hazards of high voltage; two common standards used three (two-phase+neutral) and five (four phases+neutral) wires. These systems were obviated by the development of the electrical transformer, but some installations retained a two-phase four-wire system for motors. The chief advantage of the latter was that the winding configuration was the same as for a single-phase capacitor-start motor and, by using a four-wire system, conceptually the phases were independent and easy to analyse with mathematical tools available at the time.

Two-phase systems can also be implemented using three wires (two "hot" plus a common neutral). However this introduces asymmetry; the voltage drop in the neutral makes the phases not exactly 90 degrees apart.

Two-phase systems have been replaced with three-phase systems. The move from two to three phases was originally motivated by making a more ideal rotating field for AC motors: Mikhail Dolivo-Dobrovolsky calculated that, for simple winding configurations of the time, the magnetic field fluctuation can be reduced from 40% to 15%. This is less important in modern machines that create a nearly ideal rotating field using sinusoidally distributed windings, but three-phase systems retain other advantages.

A two-phase supply with 90 degrees between phases can be derived from a three-phase system using a Scott-connected transformer, which can also produce three-phase power from a two-phase input.

A polyphase system must provide a defined direction of phase rotation, so mirror image voltages do not count towards the phase order. A 3-wire system with two phase conductors 180 degrees apart is still only single phase. Such systems are sometimes described as split-phase.

== Motors ==
Three-phase electric machine with rotating magnetic fields

Polyphase power is particularly useful in AC motors, such as the induction motor, where it generates a rotating magnetic field. When a three-or-more-phase supply completes one full cycle, the magnetic field of a two-poles-per-phase motor has rotated through 360° in physical space; motors with more than two poles per phase require more power supply cycles to complete one physical revolution of the magnetic field and so these motors run more slowly. Induction motors using a rotating magnetic field were independently invented by Galileo Ferraris and Nikola Tesla and developed in a three-phase form by Mikhail Dolivo-Dobrovolsky in 1889. Previously all commercial motors were DC, with expensive commutators, high-maintenance brushes and characteristics unsuitable for operation on an alternating current network. Polyphase motors are simple to construct, are self-starting and have little vibration compared with single-phase motors.

== Higher phase order ==
Once polyphase power is available, it may be converted to any desired number of phases with a suitable arrangement of transformers. Thus, the need for more than three phases is unusual, but higher phase numbers than three have been used.

High-phase-order (HPO) power transmission has been frequently proposed as a way to increase transmission capacity within a limited-width right of way. Transmitted power is proportional to the square of the phase-to-ground voltage drop, but transmission lines require conductors spaced adequately distant to prevent both phase-to-ground and phase-to-phase electrical arcs. For three-phase power, the phase-to-phase voltage, which is √3≈1.7 times the phase-to-ground voltage, dominates. Higher-phase systems at the same phase-to-ground voltage have less voltage difference between adjacent phases, allowing a tighter conductor spacing. For six- and higher-phase power systems, the dominant effect becomes the phase-to-ground voltage instead.

Six-phase operation thus lets an existing double-circuit transmission line carry more power without requiring additional conductor cable. However, it requires the capital expense and impedance losses of new phase-converting transformers to interface with the conventional three-phase grid. They are particularly economical when the alternative is upgrading an existing extra high voltage (EHV, more than 345 kV phase-to-phase) transmission line to ultra-high voltage (UHV, more than 800 kV) standards.

Between 1992 and 1995, New York State Electric & Gas operated a 1.5 mile 93kV 6-phase transmission line converted from a double-circuit 3-phase 115kV transmission line. The primary result was that it is economically favorable to operate an existing double-circuit 115kV 3-phase line as a 6-phase line for distances greater than 23–28 miles.

Three-phase power lines rely on transposition to equalize across all phases transmission losses due to slight deviations from ideal geometry. This is not possible with higher-phase lines, because a transposition can only swap adjacent phases, and the dihedral group on n elements coincides with the full symmetric group only for n≤3. Full application of even that limited transposition scheme is necessary to properly protect against ground faults.

Multi-phase power generation designs with 5, 7, 9, 12, and 15 phases in conjunction with multi-phase induction generators (MPIGs) driven by wind turbines have been proposed. An induction generator produces electrical power when its rotor is turned faster than the synchronous speed. A multi-phase induction generator has more poles, and therefore a lower synchronous speed. Since the rotation speed of a wind turbine may be too slow for a substantial portion of its operation to generate single-phase or even three-phase AC power, higher phase orders allow the system to capture a larger portion of the rotational energy as electric power.

== See also ==
- Single-phase electric power
- Three-phase electric power
- Delta-wye transformer
- Phase converter
- Polyphase coil
- Y-Δ transform
- method of Symmetrical components
