= Two-phase =

Two-phase may refer to:

- Two-phase electric power
- Two-phase commit protocol
- Two-phase flow
- Two-phase locking
- Two-phase servo motor
- Binary phase, chemical compounds composed of two elements
