= 8974 =

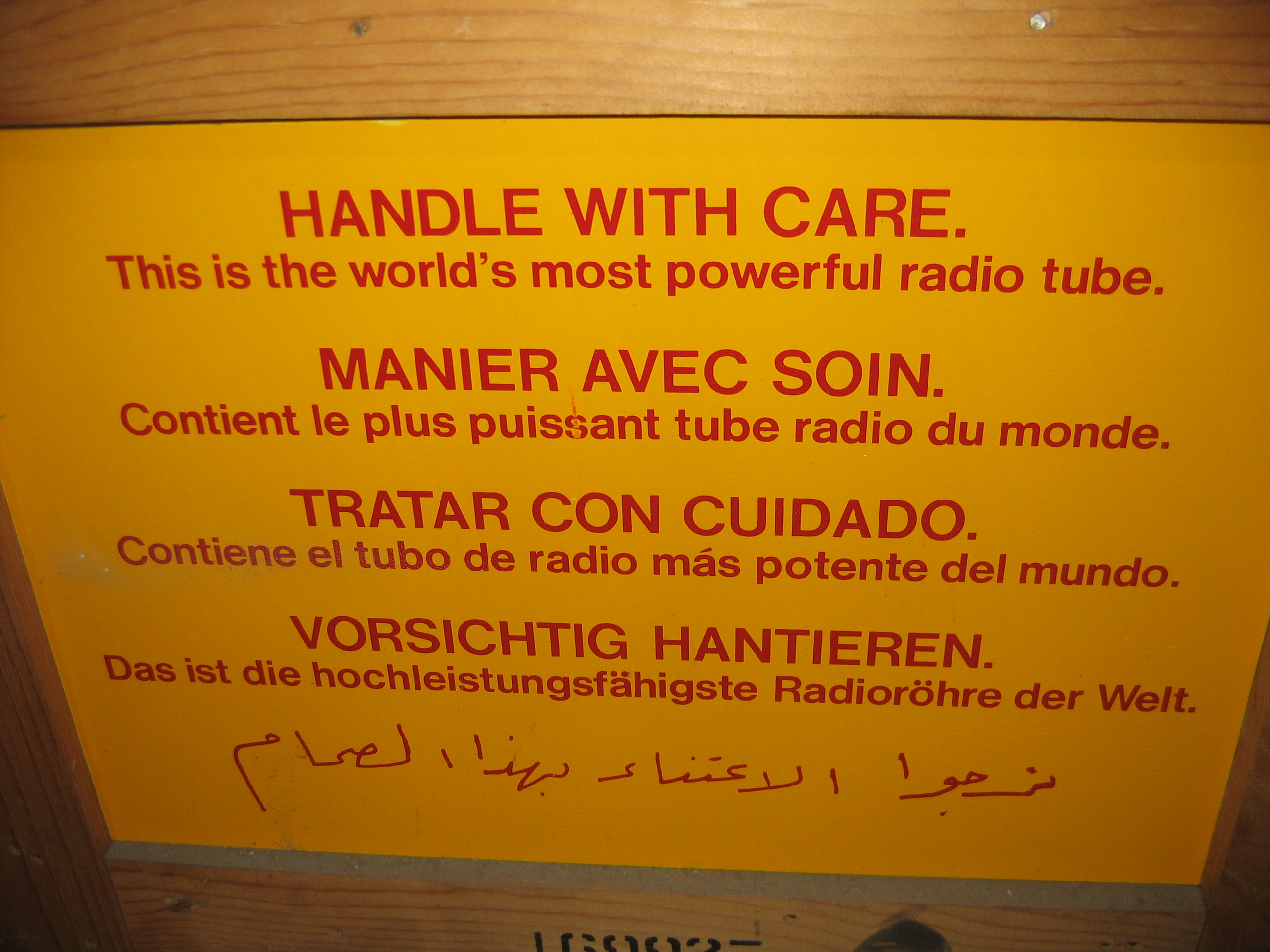
Packaging of Eimac 8974

8974 / X-2159 is a power tetrode designed for megawatt power levels in industrial and broadcast applications.

== Specifications ==
The 8974 is an external anode tube made of metal and ceramic. It has an overall height of 23.75 inches (603 mm), a diameter of 17.03 inches (433 mm), and weighs 175 pounds (79 kg). It contains two directly heated thoriated-tungsten filaments rated at 16.3 volts at approx. 1300 amperes for both filaments. The anode (plate) is designed to dissipate 1.5 MW. The tube may be operated as a class C amplifier in CW mode, where a single tube with an anode voltage of 22.5 kV DC can provide up to 2,158 kW of RF power.

== Internal construction ==
The thoriated-tungsten filament consists of two independent sections mounted on water-cooled supports. The two filaments may be excited in quadrature to reduce hum contributed by an AC power source. Each filament is rated at a nominal value of 18.5 V at approx. 650 A for a total of over 20 kW of filament power required when the tube is in operation.

== History ==
Experimental type X2159 was assigned to the development of a power tetrode by Eimac (then a division of Varian Associates) on May 28, 1970, and the design engineer was Sterling G. McNees. This electron tube was intended for use in very high power medium-frequency broadcast service and VLF communications equipment and as a pulse modulator (as a switch tube). The EIA (Electronic Industries Alliance) designation 8974 was assigned to this as it became a standard product. The initial technical data sheet was printed in July 1971.

Continental Electronics of Dallas, Texas, designed two 8974s (one as PA and the other as modulator) into their D323 series 1 megawatt AM transmitters which were sold primarily into the middle East, where stations were built to cover large geographical areas. The 8974 is still used in the same transmitters as of 2010, over 30 years later. The 8974 was also used as the basis for the development of several large tetrode switch tubes capable of operating at anode voltage up to 175 kV DC.

== Cooling ==
The anode is cooled by circulated water via two flanges located at the top of the tube. The heat is transferred to the outside environment using a radiator, or to a secondary cooling system using a heat exchanger. Controlling the purity of the water is important to prevent the formation of copper oxide which would reduce the cooling efficiency. Impurities could also cause electrolysis which could destroy the cooling passages. The plumbing connections for the water inlet and outlet are made at the anode, where a high DC voltage (up to 22 kV DC) is present. Forced air is used to provide additional cooling to the filament and grid connections at the bottom of the tube.
