= Phase converter =

Electrical power device

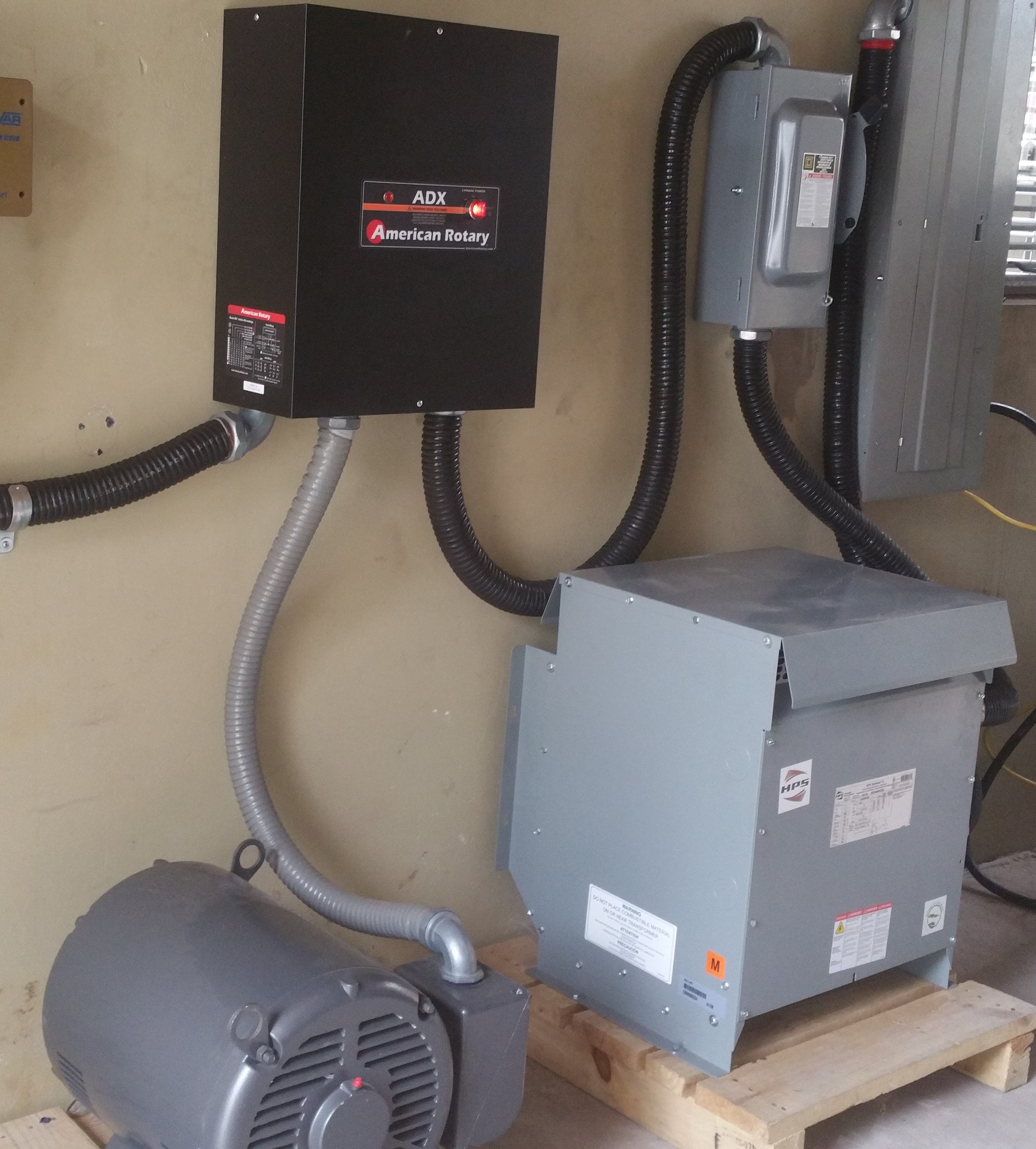
An American Rotary Phase Converter with a Transformer

A phase converter is a device that converts electric power provided as single phase to multiple phase or vice versa. The majority of phase converters are used to produce three-phase electric power from a single-phase source, thus allowing the operation of three-phase equipment at a site that only has single-phase electrical service. Phase converters are used where three-phase service is not available from the utility provider or is too costly to install. A utility provider will generally charge a higher fee for a three-phase service because of the extra equipment, including transformers, metering, and distribution wire required to complete a functional installation.

== Types of Phase Converters ==
Three-phase induction motors may operate adequately on an unbalanced supply if not heavily loaded. This allows various imperfect techniques to be used. A single-phase motor can drive a three-phase generator, which will produce a high-quality three-phase source but at a high cost to the longevity of the system. While there are multiple phase conversion systems in place, the most common types are:

- Rotary phase converters constructed from a three-phase electric motor or generator "idler" and a simple on/off circuit. Rotary phase converters are known to drive up operations costs, due to the continued draw of power while idling that is not common in other phase converters. Rotary phase converters are considered a two-motor solution; one motor is not connected to a load and produces the three-phase power, the second motor driving the load runs on the power produced.
- A digital phase converter uses a rectifier and inverter to create a third leg of power, which is added to the two legs of the single-phase source to create three-phase power. Unlike a phase-converting VFD, it cannot vary the frequency and motor speed, since it generates only one leg. Digital phase Converters use a Digitial Signal Processor (DSP) to ensure the generated third leg matches the voltage and frequency of the original single-phase supply. It does have the advantage of a sine-wave output voltage and excellent voltage balance between the phases. More details about these methods are explained in the patents Medagam et al. “Active Single Phase to Three Phase Power Converter” US Patent 10,333,420 and Meiners et al. “Phase Converter” US 6,297,971.
- Static conversion techniques "jump start" a motor by temporarily providing the necessary power levels before transitioning back down to single phase power levels. These systems are unfit to run multiple machines or machines that require a maximum RPM due to their temporary nature. In these systems the motor must be derated and they are prone to overheating.

== Rotary Phase Converters ==
A rotary phase converter is a common way to create three-phase power in an area where three-phase utility power is not available or cannot be brought in. A rotary phase converter uses a control panel with a start circuit and run circuit to create power without excessive voltage. A three-phase motor uses a rotating magnet surrounded by three sets of coils to produces the third leg of power within the idler motor. Some rotary phase converters are digitally controlled, enabling them to produce power that can run on voltage-sensitive loads such as a CNC machine, welder, or any other computer-controlled load.

A rotary phase converter does not change the voltage, but it can be paired with a transformer to step the voltage up or down depending on what is needed.

== Digital Phase Converters ==
A Digital Phase Converter creates a three-phase power supply from a single-phase supply. A Digital Signal Processor (DSP) is used to control power electronic devices to generate a third leg of voltage, which along with the standard, single-phase voltage from the supply creates a balanced three-phase power supply.

AC power from the utility is converted to DC, then back to AC using insulated-gate bipolar transistors (IGBTs). This conversion process allows for the generation of the third leg from the existing power supply.

In one type of digital phase converter, the input rectifier consists of IGBTs being used alongside inductors to create the third leg of power. The IGBTs are controlled by software in the DSP to draw current from the single-phase line in a sinusoidal fashion, charging capacitors on a constant-voltage DC bus. Because the incoming current is sinusoidal, there are no significant harmonics generated back onto the line as there are with the rectifiers found in most VFDs. The controlled rectifier input allows power factor correction to take place.

The second half of the digital phase converter consists of IGBTs that draw on the power previously stored in the DC bus to create an AC voltage that is not sinusoidal. It is a pulse-width modulated (PWM) waveform very high in harmonic distortion. This voltage is then passed through an inductor/capacitor filter system that produces a sine-wave voltage with less than 3% total harmonic distortion (standards for computer grade power allow up to 5% THD). By contrast, VFDs generate a PWM voltage that limits their versatility and makes them unsuitable for many applications. Software in the DSP continually monitors and adjusts this generated voltage to produce a balanced three-phase output at all times. It also provides protective functions by shutting down in case of utility over-voltage and under-voltage or a fault. With the ability to adjust to changing conditions and maintain voltage balance, a digital phase converter can safely and efficiently operate virtually any type of three-phase equipment or any number of multiple loads.

Since Digital Phase Converters are solid-state designs, there are little to no moving parts except for cooling fans. In turn, this allows digital phase converters to be fit into small packages and operate between 95% and 98% efficiency. These converters also do not draw power when idling, reducing overall costs and increasing longevity.

== Electric railways ==
In Europe, electricity is normally generated as three-phase AC at 50 hertz. Five European countries: Germany, Austria, Switzerland, Norway and Sweden have standardized on single-phase AC at 15 kV 16 2/3 Hz for railway electrification. Phase converters are, therefore, used to change both the phase and the frequency.

== See also ==
- Rotary phase converter
- Variable frequency drive
- Scott-T transformer
