= Jonas Wenström =

Swedish engineer and inventor (1855–1893)

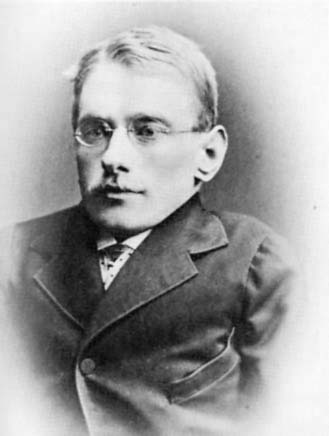
- Born: 4 August 1855
- Died: 22 December 1893 (aged 38)
- Occupations: Electrical engineer, inventor

Jonas Wenström (4 August 1855 in Hällefors – 22 December 1893 in Västerås) was a Swedish engineer and inventor, who in 1890 received a Swedish patent on the same three-phase system independently developed by Mikhail Dolivo-Dobrovolsky. This formed the basis for ASEA (later ABB). The possibility of transferring electrical power from a waterfall at a distance was explored at the Grängesberg mine. A 45 m fall at Hällsjön, Smedjebackens kommun, where a small iron work had been located, was selected. In 1893, a three-phase 9.5 kV system was used to transfer 400 horsepower a distance of 15 km, becoming the first commercial application.

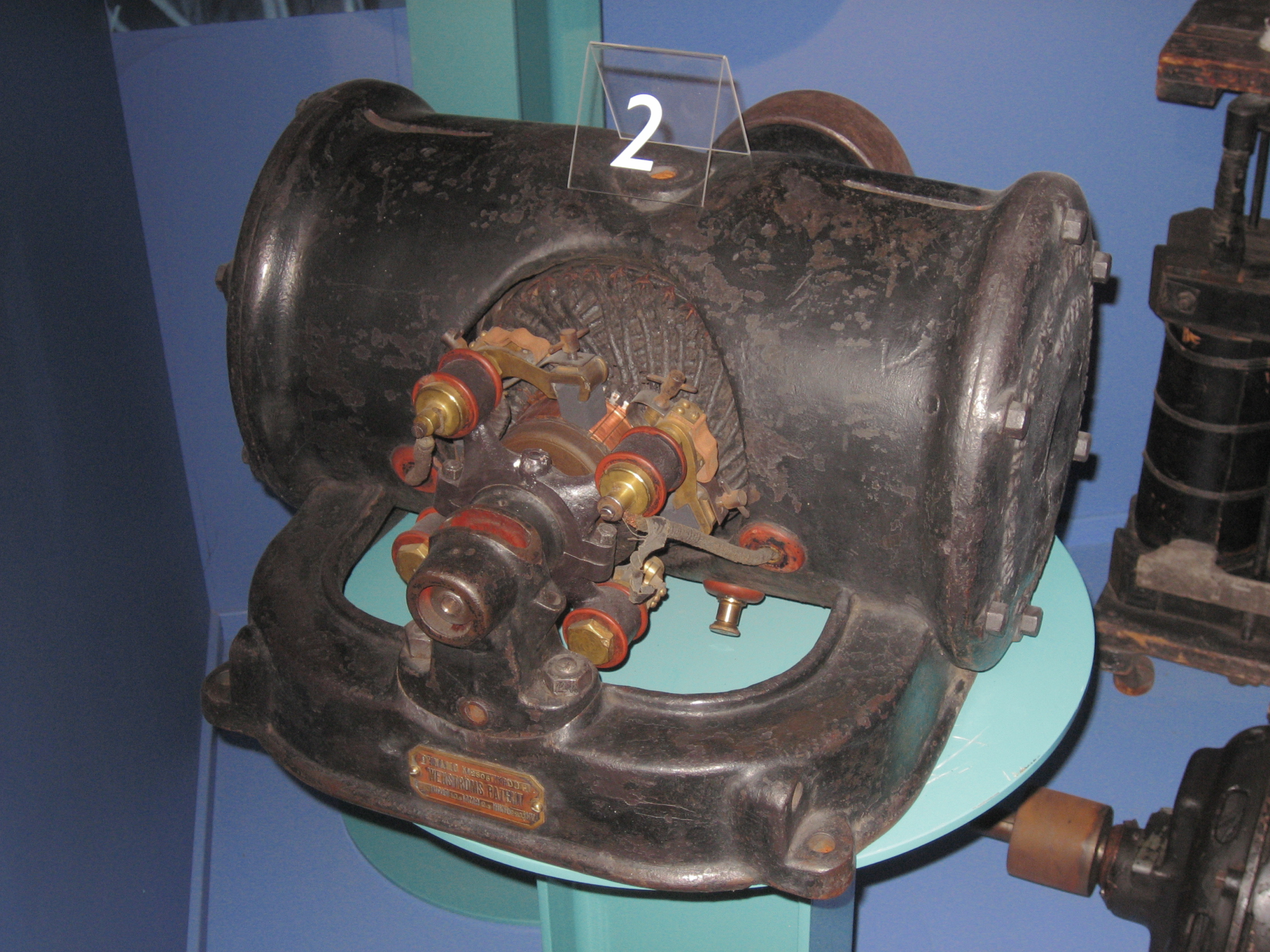
Dynamo of Wenström's patent

About the invention of electric light, Wenström wrote: "Edison's new invention of electric light: a glowing carbon strip, is the same thing that I discovered a year ago ... If I had his laboratory, and resources, I would have done the same and better ... a graphite strip between two mica plates provide a more effective light than Edison's."
