= Two-phase electric power =

Electric power distribution system

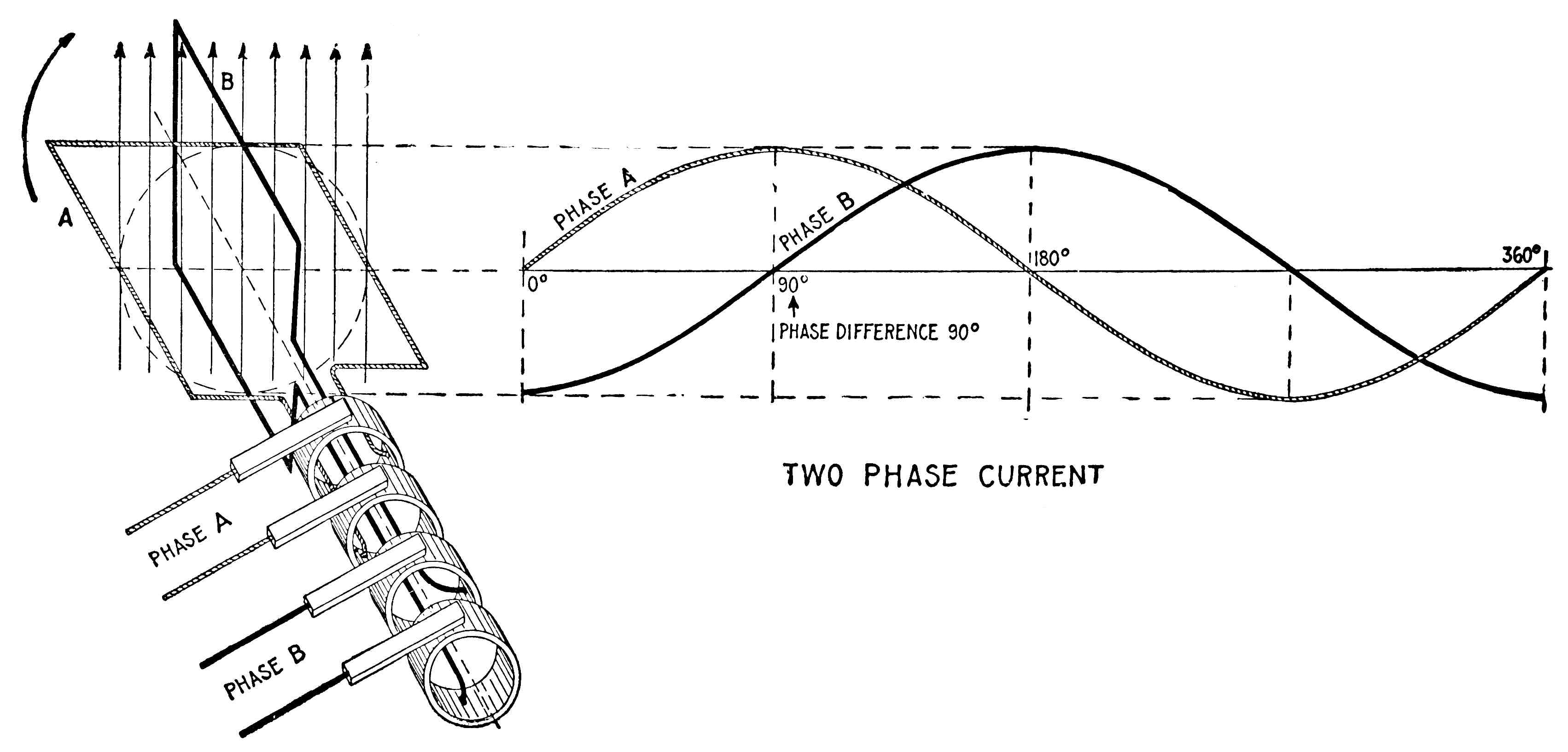
A simplified diagram of a two-phase alternator

Two-phase electrical power was an early 20th-century polyphase alternating current electric power distribution system. Two circuits were used, with voltage phases differing by one-quarter of a cycle, 90°. Usually circuits used four wires, two for each phase. Less frequently, three wires were used, with a common wire with a larger-diameter conductor. Some early two-phase generators had two complete rotor and field assemblies, with windings physically offset to provide two-phase power. The generators at Niagara Falls installed in 1895 were the largest generators in the world at that time, and were two-phase machines. Three-phase systems eventually replaced the original two-phase power systems for power transmission and utilization. Active two-phase distribution systems remain in Center City Philadelphia, where many commercial buildings are permanently wired for two-phase, and in Hartford, Connecticut.

== Comparison with single-phase power ==
The advantage of two-phase electrical power over single-phase was that it allowed for simple, self-starting electric motors. In the early days of electrical engineering, it was easier to analyze and design two-phase systems where the phases were completely separated. It was not until the invention of the method of symmetrical components in 1918 that polyphase power systems had a convenient mathematical tool for describing unbalanced load cases. The revolving magnetic field produced with a two-phase system allowed electric motors to provide torque from zero motor speed, which was not possible with a single-phase induction motor (without an additional starting means). Induction motors designed for two-phase operation use a similar winding configuration as capacitor start single-phase motors. However, in a two-phase induction motor, the impedances of the two windings are identical.

Two-phase circuits also have the advantage of constant combined power into an ideal load, whereas power in a single-phase circuit pulsates at twice the line frequency due to the zero crossings of voltage and current.

== Comparison with three-phase power ==
Three-phase electric power requires less conductor mass for the same voltage and overall power, compared with a two-phase four-wire circuit of the same carrying capacity. It has replaced two-phase power for commercial distribution of electrical energy, but two-phase circuits are still found in certain control systems.

Two-phase circuits typically use two separate pairs of current-carrying conductors. Alternatively, three wires may be used, but the common conductor carries the vector sum of the phase currents, which requires a larger conductor. The vector sum of balanced three-phase currents, however, is zero, allowing for the neutral wires to be eliminated. In electrical power distribution, a requirement of only three conductors, rather than four, represented a considerable distribution-wire cost savings due to the expense of conductors and installation.

While both two-phase and three-phase circuits have a constant combined power for an ideal load, practical devices such as motors can suffer from power pulsations in two-phase systems. These power pulsations tend to cause increased mechanical noise in transformer and motor laminations due to magnetostriction and torsional vibration in generator and motor drive shafts.

Two-phase power can be derived from a three-phase source using two transformers in a Scott connection: One transformer primary is connected across two phases of the supply. The second transformer is connected to a center-tap of the first transformer, and is wound for 86.6% of the phase-to-phase voltage on the three-phase system. The secondaries of the transformers will have two phases 90 degrees apart in time, and a balanced two-phase load will be evenly balanced over the three supply phases.

== See also ==
- Polyphase system
- Rotary converter
- Single-phase electric power
- Split-phase electric power
- Three-phase electric power
