= Mikhail Dolivo-Dobrovolsky =

Engineer (1862–1919)

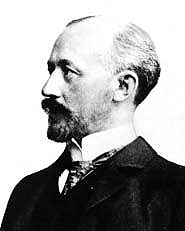
- Dolivo-Dobrovolsky ca. 1908
- Born: Mikhail Dolivo-Dobrovolsky; 2 January 1862
- Died: 15 November 1919 (aged 57)

Mikhail Osipovich Dolivo-Dobrovolsky (Russian: Михаи́л О́сипович Доли́во-Доброво́льский; Polish: Michał Doliwo-Dobrowolski;German: Michail von Dolivo-Dobrowolsky or Michail Ossipowitsch Doliwo-Dobrowolski; 2 January 1862 [O.S. 21 December 1861] – 15 November [O.S. 2 November] 1919) was a Russian-born engineer, electrician, and inventor of Polish-Russian origins, active in the German Empire and also in Switzerland.

After studying in Germany and while working in Berlin for Allgemeine Elektricitäts-Gesellschaft (AEG), he became one of the founders (the others were Nikola Tesla, Galileo Ferraris and Jonas Wenström) of polyphase electrical systems, developing the three-phase electrical generator and a three-phase electrical motor (1888) and studying star and delta connections. The triumph of the three-phase system was displayed in Europe at the International Electro-Technical Exhibition of 1891, where Dolivo-Dobrovolsky used this system to transmit electric power at the distance of 176 km with 75% efficiency. In 1891 he also created a three-phase transformer and short-circuited (squirrel-cage) induction motor. He designed the world's first three-phase hydroelectric power plant in 1891.

== Life ==
Mikhail Dolivo-Dobrovolsky was born as the son of the Polish noble of the Doliwa coat of arms working in Russia as a civil servant Józef Doliwa-Dobrowolski (Josif Florovich Dolivo-Dobrovolsky) and Olga Mikhailovna Ewreinova also from a Russian noble family in Gatchina near Saint Petersburg. He spent his school days in Odesa, where his father was transferred in 1872. After secondary school he went at the age of 16 to the Riga Polytechnic, a college founded by Baltic Germans, teaching in German language. At the end of the 1870s, after a series of assassination attempts and finally the murder of Tsar Alexander II in 1881, a wave of anti-Polish repression broke out, with which all progressively oriented students were expelled from their university, which was equivalent to a study ban in all of Russia. Among them was Dolivo-Dobrovolsky. After his forced exmatriculation in Riga in 1881, he left his homeland in 1883 and went to Germany.

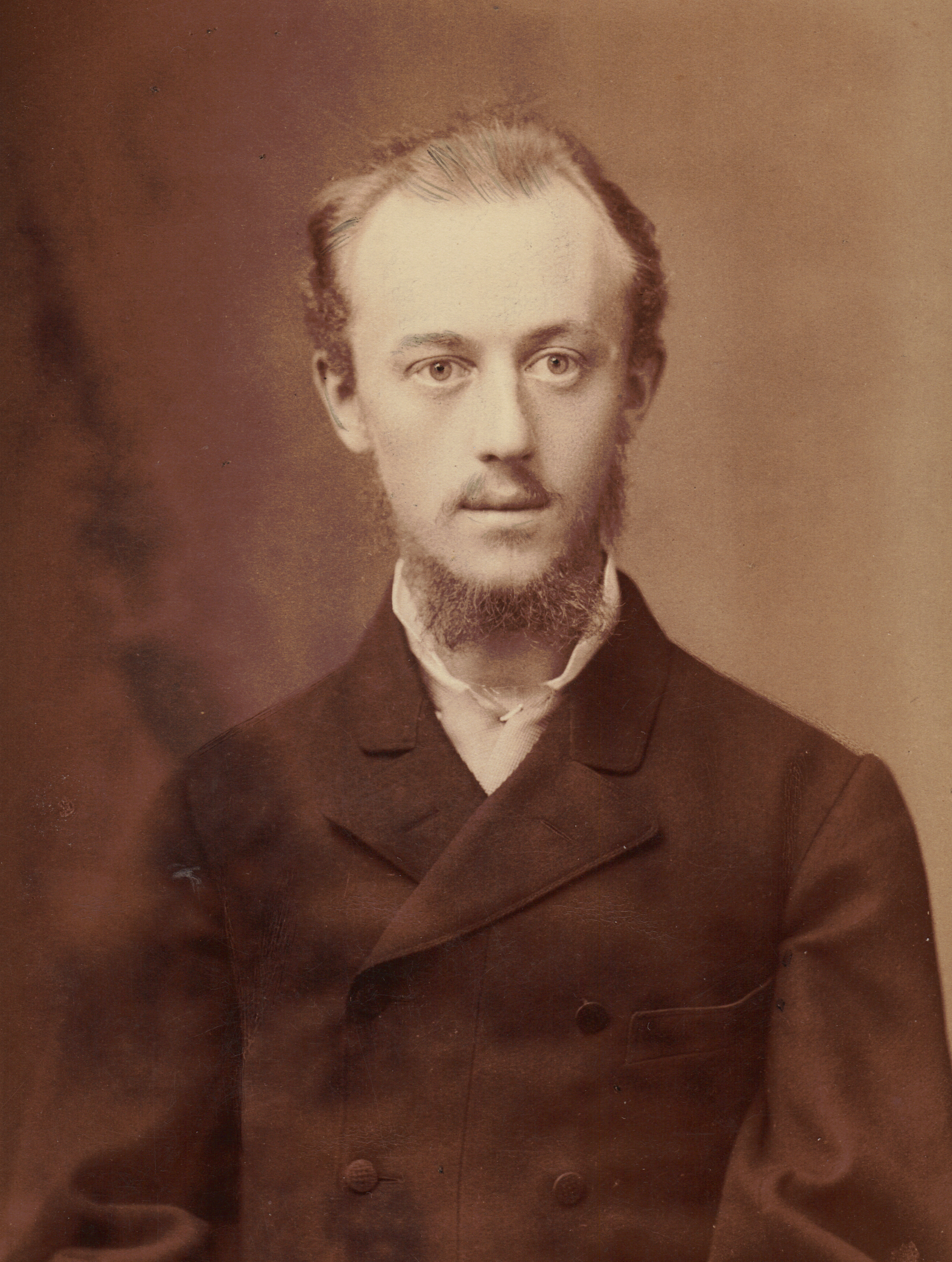
Dobrovolsky, age 22

He studied at the first chair of electrical engineering worldwide, at the Technische Hochschule Darmstadt in the German Empire Grand Duchy of Hesse from 1883 to 1884. From 1885 to 1887, he became one of de:Erasmus Kittler's first assistants. There he published several smaller publications and was in close contact with Carl Hering, a mechanical engineer from the USA and Kittler's first assistant.

After the inventions, Dolivo-Dobrovolsky continued his research in the field of heavy current technology, inventing the phase meter in 1892 and the ferrodynamic wattmeter in 1909. He published papers and gave numerous lectures. From 1903 to 1907 he devoted himself to scientific work in Lausanne, where he acquired Swiss citizenship with his entire family in 1906. After his return to Berlin, he continued his work at AEG and became Technical Director of the apparatus factory in 1909. On 24 October 1911, he received an honorary doctorate from the TH Darmstadt, whose Dolivo building bears his name today. During his life he obtained over 60 patents.

In 1919, Dolivo-Dobrovolski died of a severe heart condition at the academic hospital in Heidelberg. He was buried at the forest cemetery of Darmstadt, where his grave (grave site: R 6a 7) - located very close to the memorial of his teacher de:Erasmus Kittler - can still be visited today. In the city centre of Darmstadt in 1969 a street was named after Dr.-Ing. E. h. Michael Dolivo-Dobrovolsky, the Dolivostraße.

== Invention of the three-phase system ==
In 1887, Director General Emil Rathenau of the Allgemeine Elektricitäts-Gesellschaft AG (AEG) in Berlin offered him a position, whereupon Dolivo-Dobrovolsky remained associated with the company until the end of his life. At the AEG, Dolivo-Dobrovolsky initially made an effort to further perfect direct current technology. After all, AEG's origins lay in an Edison subsidiary, and Edison, like Siemens, relied entirely on direct current. At that time, alternating current gradually attracted the attention of technicians, and engineers from Ganz Works in Budapest had designed the first transformer in today's sense in 1885. However, AC technology required further equipment, especially reliable and self-starting motors; AC theory was also still underdeveloped. Before Dolivo-Dobrovolsky, the Italian Galileo Ferraris drew attention to alternating current. He invented the first AC motor in 1885. After him, the German engineer Friedrich August Haselwander develops the first AC three-phase synchronous generator in Europe which produced about 2.8 kW at 960 rev/min, corresponding to a frequency of 32 cycles per second or 32 hertz in modern units. The machine had a stationary, ring-shaped, three-phase armature and a rotating ‘internal-pole magnet’ with four wound salient poles, which provided the revolving field. The patent application filed in July 1887. The first AC 3 phase synchronous generator went into operation in October 1887.

Regardless of these events, a forward-looking solution was found at AEG in 1888. Dolivo-Dobrovolsky worked with chained three-phase alternating current and introduced the term three-phase current. The associated asynchronous motor invented by him was the first functional solution. However, the asynchronous motor with squirrel-cage rotor had the problem of delivering only low torque at low speeds, such as when starting up. The solution was the slip ring motor, a variation of the asynchronous motor in which the short circuit of the rotor is opened and guided to the outside via sliprings. By connecting various external resistors, Dolivo-Dobrovolsky was able to introduce an asynchronous motor with high starting torque in 1891.

At the beginning of 1889, the first AEG three-phase motors were in operation, and in the following year they already produced 2 to 3 horsepower. Dolivo-Dobrovolsky paid attention to well distributed windings, a low dispersion of the lines of force and as uniform a force field as possible and achieved a satisfactory result. In 1891, he also developed the first Delta-wye transformer for this purpose.

== First remote transmission of electrical energy ==
At AEG and the Swiss cooperation partner Maschinenfabrik Oerlikon (MFO), all components for a three-phase network were available, but until now they had only been in trial operation. At this time, Oskar von Miller made the extremely daring proposal to present the three-phase current transmission system Lauffen-Frankfurt at the International Electrotechnical Exhibition planned for 1891 in Frankfurt at the MFO, where Dolivo-Dobrovolsky and his chief electrician partner Charles E. L. Brown realized the project: A 300 HP three-phase AC generator of the MFO was to be driven by the water turbine of the cement plant in Lauffen am Neckar, generating a voltage of about 50 V and 40 Hz, transforming it up to 15 kV (later 25 kV) and then transmitting it via 175 km of overhead line to Frankfurt and transforming it down again to supply a 100 HP asynchronous motor and several small three-phase motors as well as about 1000 incandescent lamps. The power output of the motors, which had previously been in test operation, was still only 2 to 3 hp. Nevertheless, the plant was put into operation on the evening of 24 August 1891, and a test committee determined that 75% of the energy generated in Lauffen arrived in Frankfurt. This proved that, on the one hand, alternating current was profitable for a large-scale public electricity supply and, on the other hand, that the three-phase components were now of the same quality as those of direct current technology. The image-boosting effect of the demonstration at the World Expo finally led to the breakthrough of three-phase AC technology. At Siemens and Edison, however, AC technology only slowly gained acceptance, which enabled AEG to become a global company. Dolivo-Dobrovolsky later switched to 50 Hz, as 40 Hz had flicker to the human eye.

== Sources ==
- https://web.archive.org/web/20050908025431/http://erudite.nm.ru/DolivoDobr.htm
- https://web.archive.org/web/20110926231334/http://library.istu.edu/hoe/personalia/dolivo.pdf
