= Charles F. Scott (engineer) =

American electrical engineer (1864–1944)

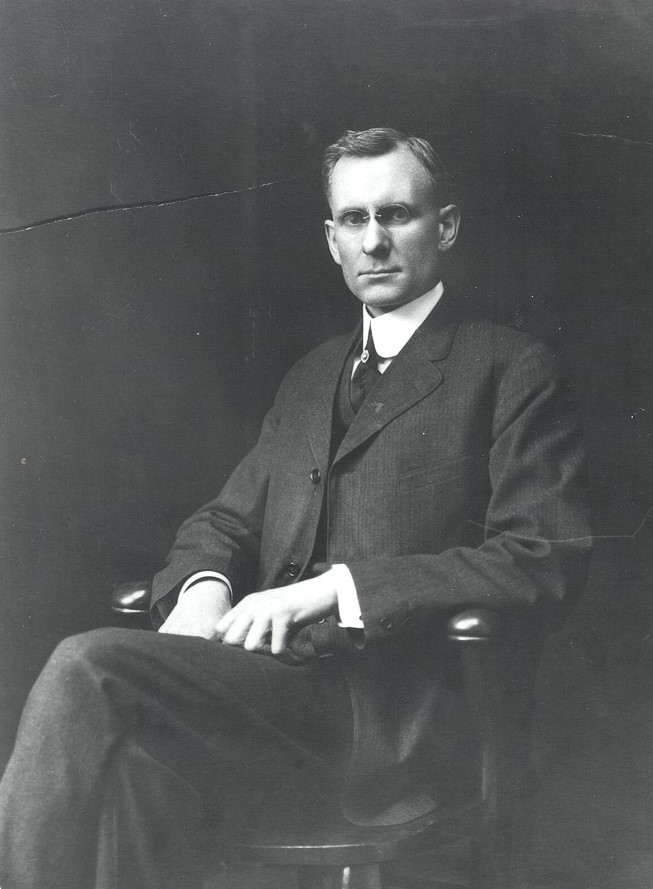
- Born: September 19, 1864; Athens, Ohio, U.S.
- Died: December 17, 1944 (aged 80)
- Awards: IEEE Edison Medal (1929)

Charles Felton Scott (September 19, 1864 – December 17, 1944) was an American electrical engineer, professor at Yale University and known for his invention of the Scott-T transformer in the 1890s.

He graduated from Ohio State University in 1885 and went on to graduate study at Johns Hopkins University. Scott joined the engineering staff of the Westinghouse Electric and Manufacturing Company in Pittsburgh, Pennsylvania, in 1888. He assisted the inventor Nikola Tesla with his work on the alternating-current induction motor. Scott also carried out experimental high voltage transmission line work at Telluride, Colorado with Ralph D. Mershon.

He was president of the American Institute of Electrical Engineers (AIEE later IEEE). He received the 1929 AIEE Edison Medal.
