= Single-phase electric power =

Type of electric power distribution

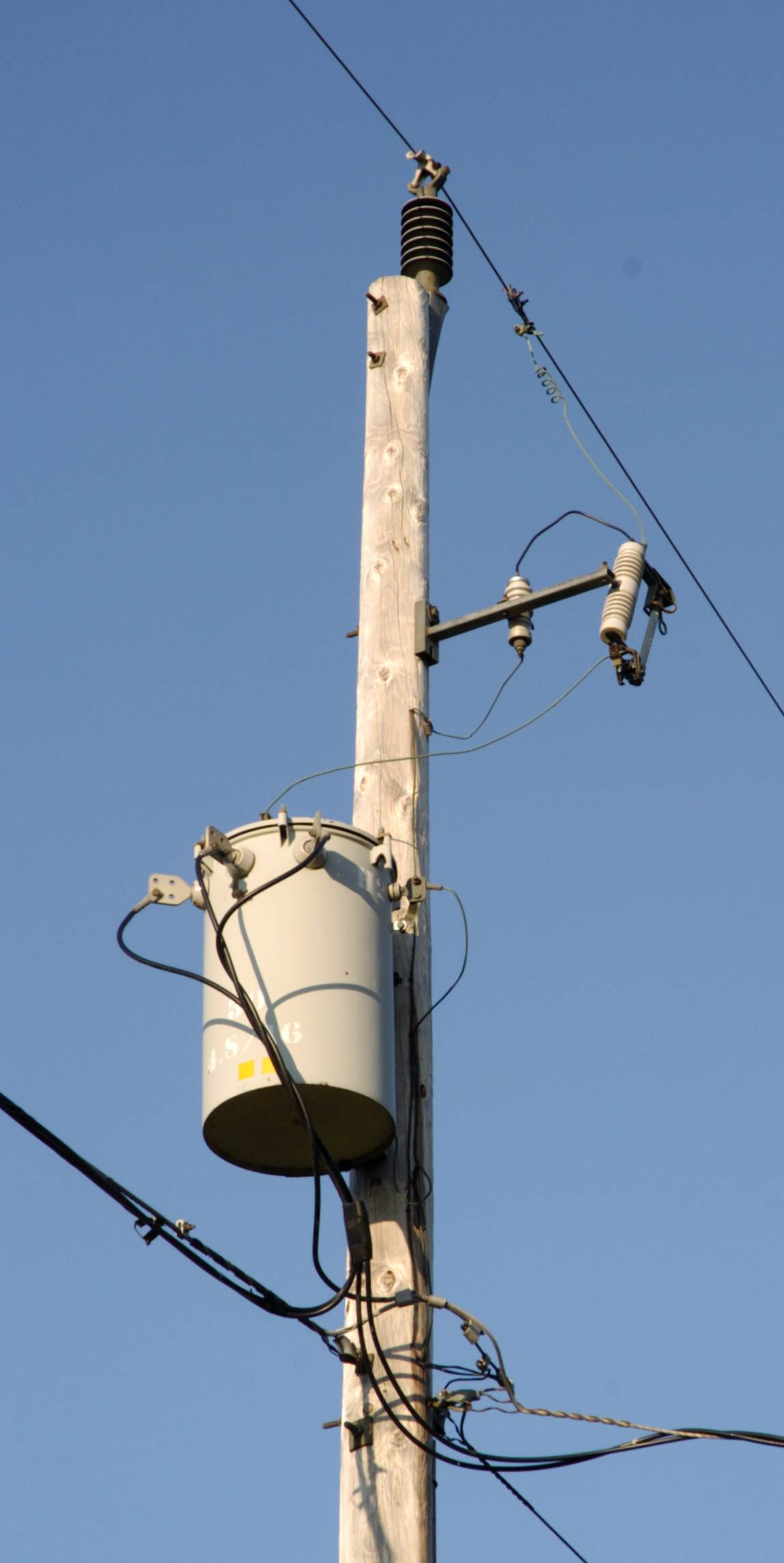
A single-phase polemount stepdown transformer in Canada. One supply phase (phase-to-neutral) from the utility is converted to split-phase for the customers.

Single-phase electric power (abbreviated 1φ) is the simplest form of alternating current (AC) power used to supply electricity. In a single-phase system, all the voltages vary together in unison, creating a single alternating waveform. This type of power is widely used for homes, small businesses, and other applications where the main needs are for lighting, heating, and small appliances.

Unlike three-phase systems, single-phase power does not naturally produce a rotating magnetic field, so motors designed for it require extra components to start and generally have lower power ratings (rarely above 10 kW). Because the voltage peaks twice during each cycle, the instantaneous power delivered is not constant, which can make it less efficient for running large machinery.

Most of the world’s single-phase systems operate at a standard frequency of either 50 or 60 Hz. Some specialized systems, such as traction power networks for electric railways, may use other frequencies such as 16.67 Hz.

== History ==
Single phase power transmission took many years to develop. The earliest developments were based on the early alternator inventions of 19th-century Parisian scientist Hippolyte Pixii, which were later expanded upon by Lord Kelvin and others in the 1880s. The first full AC power system, based on single phase alternating current, was created by William Stanley with financial support from Westinghouse in 1886. In 1897, experiments began for single phase power transmission.

== Applications ==
In North America, individual residences and small commercial buildings with services up to about 100 kVA (417 amperes at 240 volts) will usually have three-wire single-phase distribution, especially in rural areas where motor loads are small and uncommon. In rural areas where no three-phase supply is available, farmers or households who wish to use three-phase motors may install a phase converter. Larger consumers such as large buildings, shopping centers, factories, office blocks, and multiple-unit apartment blocks have three-phase service. In densely populated areas of cities, network power distribution is used with many customers and many supply transformers connected to provide hundreds or thousands of kilo-volt-amperes, a load concentrated over a few hundred square meters.

High-power systems, hundreds of kilovolt-amperes or larger, are nearly always three-phase. The largest supply normally available as single-phase varies according to the standards of the electrical utility. In the United Kingdom a single-phase household supply may be rated 100 A or even 125 A, meaning that there is little need for three-phase in a domestic or small commercial environment. Much of the rest of Europe has traditionally had much smaller limits on the size of single phase supplies resulting in even houses being supplied with three-phase (in urban areas with three-phase supply networks).

If heating equipment designed for a 240-volt system is connected to two phases of a 208-volt supply, it will produce only 75% of its rated heating effect. Single-phase motors may have taps to allow their use on either 208-volt or 240-volt supply.

A single-phase load may be powered directly from a three-phase distribution transformer in two ways: by connection between one phase and neutral or by connection between two phases. These two give different voltages from a given supply. For example, on a 120/208 three-phase system, which is common in North America, the phase-to-neutral voltage is 120 volts and the phase-to-phase voltage is 208 volts. This allows single-phase lighting to be connected phase-to-neutral.

Single-phase power may be used for electric railways; the largest single-phase generator in the world, at Neckarwestheim Nuclear Power Plant, supplied a railway system on a dedicated traction power network.

== Grounding ==
Typically a third conductor, called ground (or "safety ground") (U.S.) or protective earth (UK, Europe, IEC), is used as a protection against electric shock, and ordinarily carries significant current only when there is a circuit fault. Several different earthing systems are in use. In some extreme rural areas single-wire earth return distribution is used.

== Splitting out ==
Single-phase is sometimes divided in half at the distribution transformer on the secondary winding to create split-phase electric power for household appliances and lighting.

== See also ==
- Single-wire earth return
- Two-phase electric power
- Three-phase electric power
