= Split-phase electric power =

Type of single-phase electric power distribution

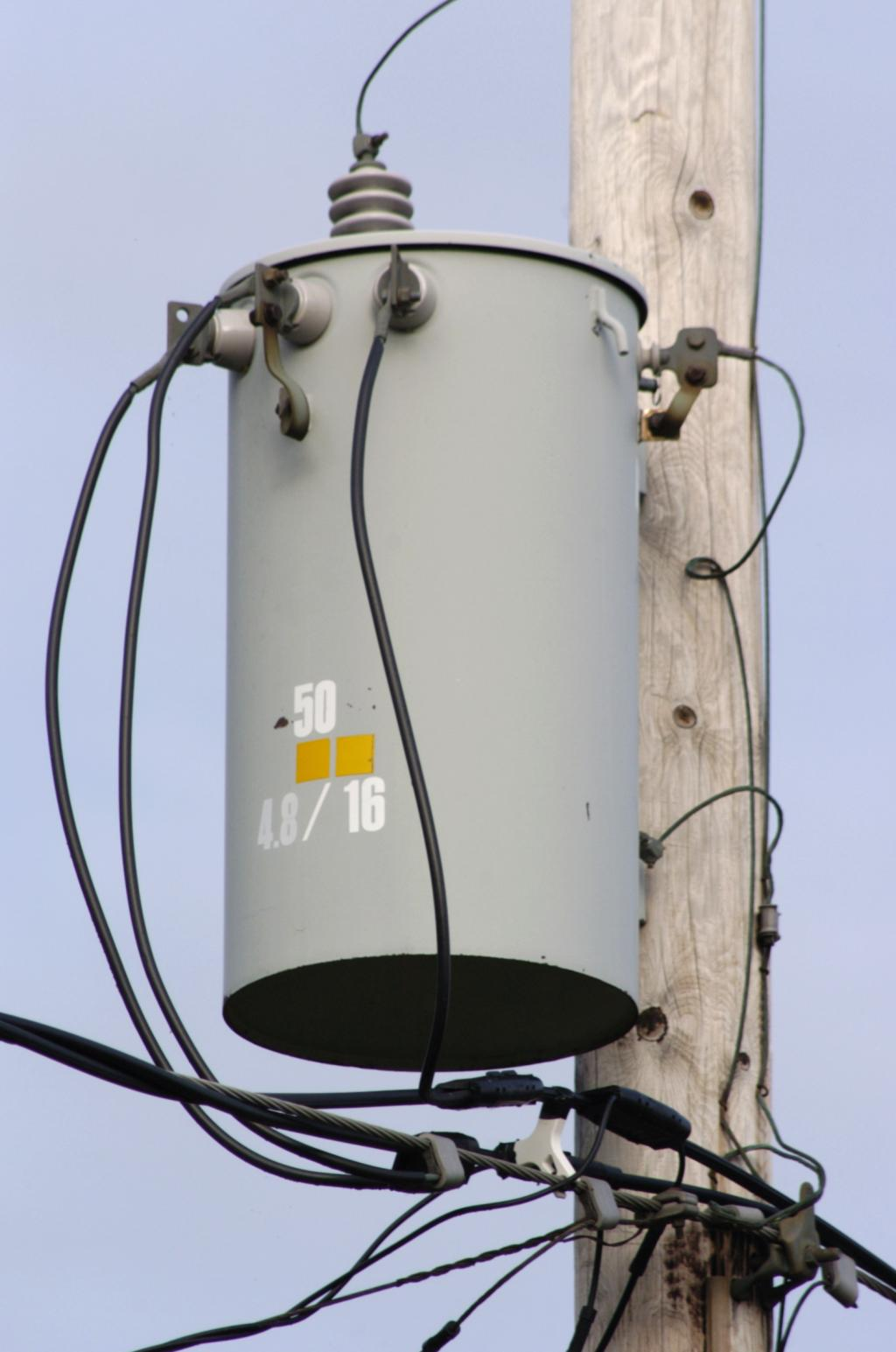
Pole-mounted single-phase transformer with a three-wire center-tapped "split-phase" secondary. On the three secondary terminals, the center tap is grounded with a short strap to the transformer case.

A split-phase or single-phase three-wire system is a form of single-phase electric power distribution. Such a system is the alternating current (AC) equivalent of the original three-wire direct current (DC) system developed by the Edison Machine Works. The main advantage of split-phase distribution is that, for a given power capacity, it requires less conductor material than a two-wire single-phase system.

Split-phase distribution is widely used in North America for residential and light commercial service. A typical installation supplies two 120 V AC lines that are 180 degrees out of phase with each other (relative to the neutral conductor), along with a shared neutral conductor. The neutral is connected to ground at the transformer's center tap.

In North America, standard household circuits for lighting and small appliances are connected between one line and the neutral, providing 120 V. Higher-demand appliances—such as ovens, dryers, and water heaters—are powered by 240 V circuits, connected between the two 120 V lines. These 240 V loads are either hardwired or use outlets designed not to be interchangeable with 120 V outlets.

Split-phase systems are also used in some specialized applications to reduce the risk of electric shock or to minimize electromagnetic noise.

== Connections ==
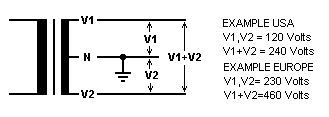
Figure 1: center-tapped secondary winding

Figure 2: phasor diagram of the output voltages

A transformer supplying a three-wire distribution system has a single-phase input (primary) winding, that is, an electromagnetic coil. The output (secondary) winding has a center tap connected to a grounded neutral. As shown in Figure 1, either end-to-center voltage is half of the end-to-end voltage. Figure 2 illustrates the phasor diagram of the output voltages for a split-phase transformer. Because the two phasors do not define a unique direction of rotation for a revolving magnetic field, a split single-phase system is not a two-phase system.

In the United States and Canada, the practice of using split-phase electric power originated with the DC distribution system developed by Thomas Edison. Connecting pairs of lamps (or other loads) in series and doubling the supply voltage reduced the size of conductors substantially. Connecting the junction of the two lamps to the center tap of the supply voltage with a shared neutral conductor stabilizes the voltage when lamps are switched on and off. The current carried in the neutral is only the imbalance of current flowing from one group of lamps to the other. This arrangement reduces the cost of installation of conductors required to serve a given amount of load.

The line-to-neutral voltage is half of the line-to-line voltage. Lighting and small appliances may be connected between a line wire and the neutral. Higher-power appliances, such as cooking or heating equipment, are connected to the two line conductors. For a given amount of power transmitted, using twice the voltage means half the current flows. Smaller conductors may be used than would be needed if the appliances were designed to be supplied by the lower voltage.

Figure 3: resistive loads on a three-wire circuit

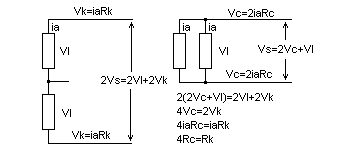
Figure 4: conductor resistance needed for loads in series at double voltage versus loads in parallel

If the load were guaranteed to be balanced (that is, the same current being drawn from each line), then the neutral conductor would carry no current, and the system would be equivalent to a single-ended system with twice the voltage in which the line wires take half the current. This system would not need a neutral conductor, but it would be impractical for varying loads; merely connecting the groups in series would result in excessive voltage and brightness variation as lamps are switched on and off.

Connecting the two lamp groups to a neutral, which is intermediate in potential between the two live legs, means that any imbalance of the load is supplied by a current in the neutral, giving more nearly constant voltage across both groups. The total current carried in all three wires (including the neutral) is always twice the supply current of the most heavily loaded half.

For short wiring runs limited by the current-carrying capacity of a conductor, this arrangement allows three half-sized conductors to be substituted for two full-sized ones, using 3/4 of the copper in an equivalent single-phase system.

Long wiring runs are limited by the permitted voltage-drop limit in the conductors. Because the supply voltage is doubled, a balanced load can tolerate double the voltage drop, allowing quarter-sized conductors to be used; this approach uses 3/8 of the copper in an equivalent single-phase system.

In practice, some intermediate limit is chosen. For example, if the imbalance is limited to 25% of the total load (that is, half of one half) rather than the worst-case 50% imbalance, then conductors with 3/8 of the single-phase size guarantee the same maximum voltage drop, totaling 9/8 of one single-phase conductor and using 9/16 of the copper in the two single-phase conductors.

== Balanced power ==
In a balanced power system (sometimes called "technical power"), an isolation transformer with a center tap creates a separate supply with conductors at balanced voltages relative to ground. The purpose of such a system is to minimize the noise coupled into sensitive equipment from the power supply.

Unlike a three-wire distribution system, the grounded neutral is not distributed to the loads; only line-to-line connections at 120 V are used. A balanced power system is used only for specialized distribution in audio and video production studios, sound and television broadcasting, and installations of sensitive scientific instruments.

The U.S. National Electrical Code provides rules for technical power installations. The systems must not be used for general-purpose lighting or other equipment, and they may use special sockets to ensure that only approved equipment is connected to the system. In addition, special attention is paid to how the distribution system is grounded.

To reduce the chance of interconnection of a balanced system with a conventional distribution system, specially labelled outlets may be used, or outlets of the technical power system may be a special type. Interconnection between two systems will unbalance the balanced system and possibly cause noise to be induced in sensitive equipment.

== Applications ==
=== Europe ===
In the United Kingdom, electric tools and portable lighting at larger construction and demolition sites are governed by the standard BS 7375; where possible, these applications are recommended to be fed from a center-tapped system with only 55 V between live conductors and the earth (known as CTE, center-tap earth, or 55–0–55). This reduced low-voltage system is used with 110 V equipment. No neutral conductor is distributed. In high-hazard locations, additional double-pole residual-current device (RCD) protection may be used. This arrangement has two goals: reducing any potential shock hazard when using electrical equipment at a wet or outdoor construction site, and eliminating the requirement for rapid automatic disconnection to prevent shocks during faults. Portable transformers that transform single-phase 240 V to this 110 V split-phase system are common pieces of construction equipment. Generator sets used for construction sites are equipped to supply this voltage directly. By contrast, a large farm may be given a 230–0–230 (nominal) supply.

As an incidental benefit of this arrangement, the filaments of 110 V incandescent lamps used on such systems are thicker and thus mechanically more rugged than those of 240 V lamps.

=== North America ===
This three-wire single-phase system is common in North America for residential and light commercial applications. Circuit breaker panels typically have two live (hot) wires, as well as a neutral, that are connected at one point to the grounded center tap of a local transformer. Usually, one of the live wires is black, and the other one is red; the neutral wire is always white or gray. Two kinds of breakers are used: single-pole circuit breakers feed 120 V circuits from one of the 120 V buses within the panel, and two-pole circuit breakers feed 240 V circuits from both buses. 120 V circuits are the most common and are used to power NEMA 1 (non-grounding) and NEMA 5 (grounding) outlets, as well as most residential and light commercial direct-wired lighting circuits. 240 V circuits are used for high-demand applications, such as air conditioners, space heaters, electric stoves, electric clothes dryers, water heaters, and electric-vehicle charge points. These applications use NEMA 10 (deprecated) or NEMA 14 (modern) outlets that do not accept 120 V plugs.

Wiring regulations govern the application of split-phase circuits so that the shared neutral can be protected from excess current. A neutral wire can be shared only by two circuits fed from opposite lines of the supply system, using circuit breakers connected by a bar so that both trip simultaneously (NEC 210.4); this arrangement prevents 120 V from feeding across 240 V circuits.

== Railways ==
In railway electrification, split-phase electric power is used on high-speed lines with 25 kV AC railway electrification. Two separate wires are run along the track: the contact wire for the locomotive and an electrically separate feeder wire. Each wire is fed with 25 kV with respect to ground (the center tap is grounded), with 50 kV between the wires. Autotransformers along the track balance the loads between the contact and feeder wires; one pole is fed to an overhead wire section, while the other wire is used for another section, reducing resistive losses. (The arrangement is known as a 2 × 25 kV autotransformer system.)

== See also ==
- Shared neutral
