= Ferraris' motor =

In 1885, Galileo Ferraris demonstrated an induction motor that also involved using two pairs of electromagnets to create a rotating magnetic field, though he did this independently of Baily. His motor more closely resembled modern ones in that the electromagnets surrounded a cylinder. More significantly, however, he proposed creating a true rotating magnetic field for it by supplying two sine wave alternating currents 90° apart. He gave his first public demonstration of the motor in 1888.

== History and description ==
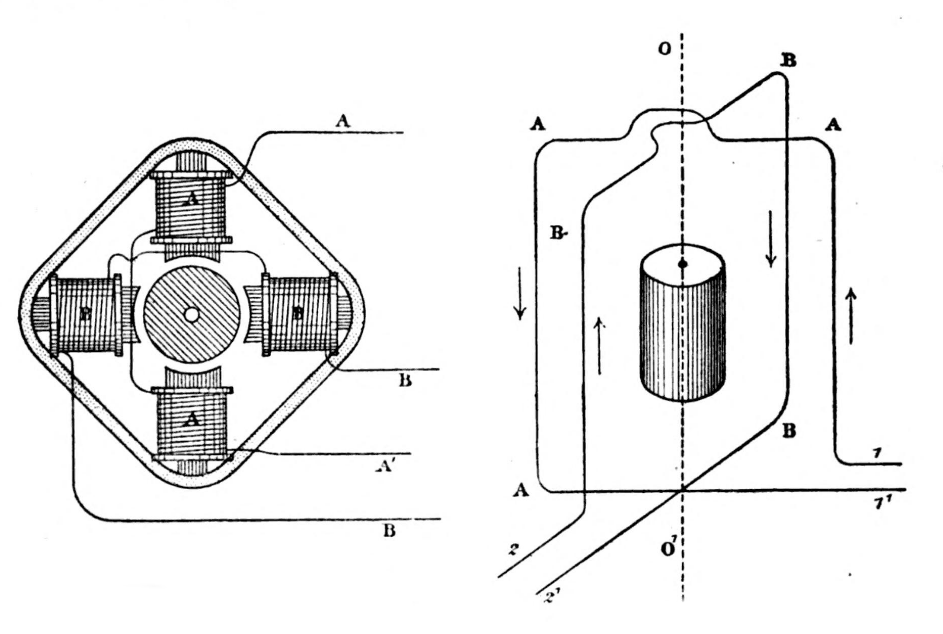
Fig. 1.—Ferrari's Motor (1885).

Professor Galileo Ferraris, of Turin, had already in 1885, arrived at the same fundamental ideas as those of Baily and of Deprez. But the result was more fruitful, inasmuch as he, without knowing of the work of either, united both sets of ideas. Like Baily he proposed to produce rotation of a copper conductor by means of eddy-currents induced in it by a progressively shifted magnetic field; and this progressively shifted magnetic field he proposed to generate as a true rotating field by combining at right angles to one another two alternate currents which differed by a quarter-period from one another.

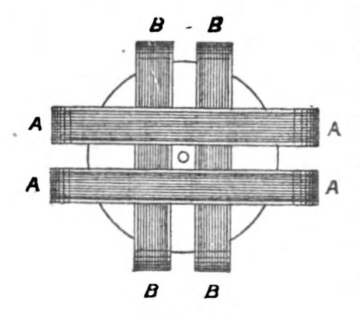
Fig. 2—Ferraris motor (larger version)

In 1885, Professor Ferraris constructed the motor depicted in plan in Fig 1, which was not, however, publicly shown till 1888. It was exhibited in 1893 at the World's Fair at Chicago. It consisted of two pairs of electromagnets A A and B B', having a common yoke made by winding iron wire around the exterior. Two alternate currents differing in phase were led into these two circuits, and the pivoted central body was observed to revolve.

Ferraris's first publication was in March 1888, entitled Electrodynamic rotations produced by means of alternate currents. After expounding the geometric theory of the rotatory magnetic field, he suggested that a simple way of procuring the desired phase-currents would be to branch the circuit of an alternate current into two parts, into one of which should be inserted a resistance without self-induction, into the other a coil of much self-induction but of small resistance. The two windings of the motor should be respectively introduced into these two branches. The difference of phase thus produced would be sufficiently near to 90° to be effective. He expressed the opinion that in this way one might obtain all the effects that can be obtained by the rotation of a magnet. He then described the following experiments which were made in the autumn of 1885.

Two flat coils, one of thick wire, the other of thinner wire, represented diagrammatically at A A and B B of Fig. 1, were set at right angles to one another. Into the first was brought a current from the primary of a Gaulard's transformer, and into the second the current from the secondary, with more or less non-inductive resistance. In the central space was suspended a small hollow closed cylinder of copper. If the current was turned on in one only of the two windings the cylinder remained immovable, but on turning on the second current it at once began to rotate. The sense of the rotation could be reversed by simply changing, with a reversing-switch, the connections of the second coil. The same results were found to follow when a cylinder of iron was substituted for that of copper. A laminated iron cylinder built up of insulated disks also turned. Then followed suggestions for constructing alternate current motors on this principle but of modified form; for, as Professor Ferraris remarked, it was evident that a motor thus made could not have any importance as a means of industrial transformation of power. He therefore designed a larger model, having as its rotating part a copper cylinder weighing 10 lbs, having a length of 18 cm, and a diameter of 8,9 cm, borne on a horizontal shaft 1 cm in diameter. It was surrounded by two sets of coils A A and B B at right angles to one another, as in the Fig. 2. It was, however, of but small power. Ferraris discussed the elementary theory of the apparatus, pointing out that the inductive action would be proportional to the slip, that is to say to the difference between the angular velocity of the magnetic field and that of the rotating cylinder, that the induced current in the rotating metal would also be proportional to this; and that the power of the motor is proportional jointly to the slip and to the velocity of the rotating part. Ferraris also suggested measuring instruments for alternate currents based on this principle. Lastly he succeeded in producing rotation in a mass of mercury placed in a vessel in the rotatory field. In 1894 Ferraris published another discussion of the theory of these motors.

== See also ==
- Arago's Rotations
- Timeline of the Electric Motor
- Rotating magnetic Field
- Induction Motor
