= Timeline of the electric motor =

Electric motors have a long history, dating back to the early nineteenth century.

== Nineteenth century ==
Date, Name	Electric Motor Chronology	Selected Patents
c.1742, Andrew Gordon	First machine which converts electrical energy into repeat mechanical motion	
1752, Benjamin Franklin	Franklin bells oscillator	
1820, Hans Christian Ørsted	Danish, physicist and chemist; first to note a compass needle deflected from magnetic north when an electric current from a battery was switched on and off, confirming a direct relationship between electricity and magnetism.	
1820, André-Marie Ampère	French, physicist; invented the solenoid.	
1821 Michael Faraday	British, scientist; showed continuous 'electromagnetic rotation' resulted by suspending a magnetic wire in an electric field;	
1822, Peter Barlow	British, physicist; invented Barlow's wheel, the first device ever powered by electromagnetism.	
1824, François Arago	French, physicist; showed a rotating copper disk produced rotation in a magnetic needle suspended above it, which Faraday later attributed to induction phenomena.	
1828, Ányos Jedlik	Hungarian, physicist and unsung father of the dynamo and electric motor; invented the first commutated rotary electromechanical machine with electromagnets. He invented the commutator. In 1828, Jedlik demonstrated the first device to contain the three main components of practical DC motors: the stator, rotor and commutator.	
Before 1830, Johann Michael Ekling	Austrian, mechanic; constructed an electric motor according to the plans of Austrian physicist Andreas von Baumgartner.	
1831 Michael Faraday	British, scientist; discovered and investigated induction law in terms of electric current generation in a varying magnetic field.	
1831, Joseph Henry	American, physicist; Created a mechanical rocker, which he however describes as a philosophical toy.	
1825–1833 William Sturgeon	British, scientist; 1825 – invented the electro-magnet; 1833 – built first commutated rotating electric machine that was demonstrated in London.	
1832–33, Hippolyte Pixii	French, instrument maker, built the first AC generating apparatus out of a rotation; and, the following year, an oscillating DC generator.	
1833, Joseph Saxton	American, inventor; demonstrated a magneto-electric machine before the British Association for the Advancement of Science.	
1833, Heinrich Friedrich Emil Lenz	German; formulated the law of reversibility of generators and motors.	
1834–1839, Moritz von Jacobi	German-Russian, engineer and physicist; built a 15 watt motor in 1834 submitted to the Academy of Sciences in Paris with details published in 1835; demonstrated first use of electric motor to propel a boat; first real useful rotary electrical motor.	
1837, Thomas Davenport and Emily Davenport	American, blacksmith-inventor and inventor; obtained first US electric motor patent.	US 132
1837–1842, Robert Davidson	Scottish, inventor; developed electric motors for a lathe and a locomotive.	
1838, Solomon Stimpson	American; built a 12-pole electric motor with segmental commutator.	US 910
1840, Truman Cook	American; built electric motor with a PM armature.	US 1735
1845, Paul-Gustav Froment	French, engineer and instrument maker; first of various motors; first motor translated linear "electromagnetic piston's" energy to wheel's rotary motion. See also Mouse mill motor.	
1856, Werner Siemens	German, industrialist; invented generator with a double-T armature and slots windings.	
1860–1863, Antonio Pacinotti	Italian, physicist; developed a ring-armature direct-current dynamo producing a nearly continuous current instead of severely isolated pulses, making it the first practical DC machine and demonstrating its operation as a motor.	
1861–1864, James Clerk Maxwell	British, scientist; reduced electromagnetism knowledge in four key equations.	
1871–1873, Zénobe Théophile Gramme	Belgian, engineer; developed the anchor ring motor which solved the double-T armature pulsating DC problem; at Vienna exhibition, demonstrated to great effect ability to transmit between generator and motor 1 km apart.	
1872–1875, Friedrich von Hefner-Alteneck	German, engineer at Siemens; developed the cylindrical drum armature, improving earlier Siemens machines and producing smoother DC, a configuration still used in modern DC motor design.	
1873, Auguste Pellerin	French; introduced laminated magnetic cores of insulated steel sheets in electric machines, reducing eddy currents and completing the key design features of modern DC motors.	
1879, Walter Baily	British; based on Arago's rotations, by manual switching on and off, developed the first primitive commutatorless induction motor.	
1880, Marcel Deprez	French, engineer; by the progressive shifting of a magnetic field through the mechanical commutator in regular order around a center, electric currents are being developed by induction in a rotating metal mass without sliding contacts or commutator.	
1885, Galileo Ferraris	Italian, physicist and engineer; conceived the generation of a continuous rotating magnetic field using phase-shifted alternating currents, and demonstrated a working model of an AC commutatorless induction motor using two-phase AC windings in space quadrature, later delivering a paper on it in April 1888.	
1887, M. Borel	Constructed a two-phase motor where the rotor is set in rotation by the combined rotating field produced with two sets of coils.	
1887, Helios Co.	Based on Coerper's patent, Helios Co. constructed the first 3-phase motor with three slip-rings. The project was dropped in 1890 as they could get satisfactory results using a 2-phase current.	
1887, Friedrich August Haselwander	Friedrich August Haselwander develops the first AC 3-phase synchronous generator in Europe. The patent application filed in July 1887. His first generator of this type went into operation in October 1887.	
1887, Charles S. Bradley	Motor/generators with a Gramme ring, having multiple radial connectors, led off at corresponding symmetrical points to slip-rings. He thus obtained alternate currents differing in phase.	US390439A
1887–1891, Nikola Tesla	Serbian-American, engineer and inventor; having worked independently from Ferraris, presented a paper in May, 1888 to AIEE describing three patented two-phase four-stator-pole motor types: one with a four-pole rotor forming a non-self-starting reluctance motor, another with a wound rotor forming a self-starting induction motor, and the third a true synchronous motor with separately-excited DC supply to rotor winding. Westinghouse acquired exclusive rights to the Tesla patents as well as the Ferraris design and retain Tesla as a consultant for a short time to work on development of these motors.	US 0,381,968; US 0,381,969; US 0,382,279; US 0,382,280
1886, Frank Julian Sprague	American, industrialist; development of new constant-speed DC motor, which allowed the Sprague company to issue the world's "first important industrial electric motor catalogue".	
1889–90, Mikhail Dolivo-Dobrovolsky	Polish-Russian, engineer and inventor; invented the first cage and wound rotor versions of the three-phase induction motor that are still widely in use today.	

== Twentieth century ==
Date, Name	Electric Motor Chronology	Selected Patents
1905, Alfred Zehden	German, a feasible linear induction motor described in patent form for driving trains or lifts.	U.S. patent 782,312
1935, Hermann Kemper	German, built a working linear induction motor	
1945–1949, Eric Laithwaite	British, first full-size working model of linear induction motor	
