= Garbage disposal unit =

Device that shreds food waste for disposal via plumbing

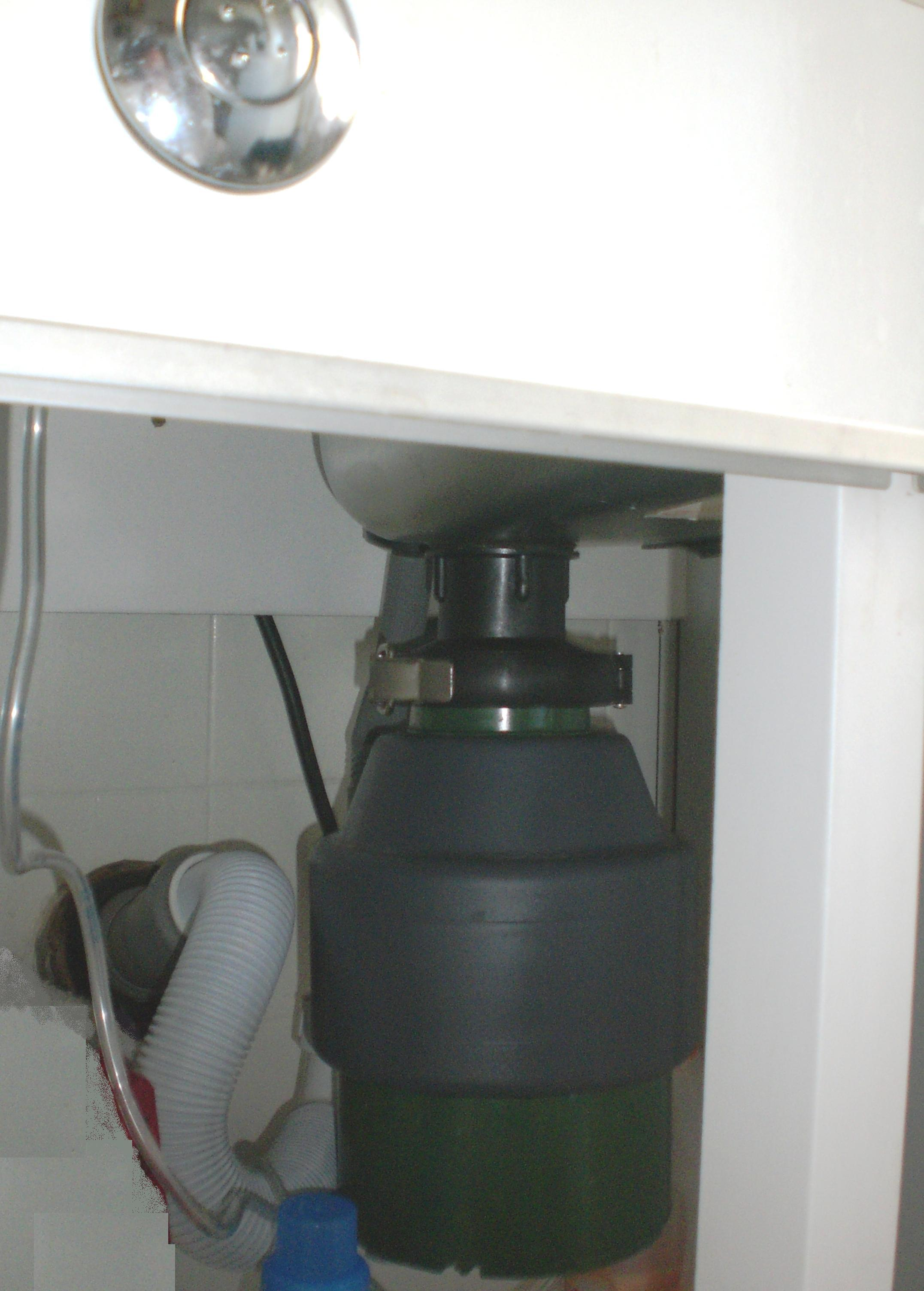
A garbage disposal unit installed under a kitchen sink

A garbage disposal unit (also known as a waste disposal unit, food waste disposer (FWD), in-sink macerator, garbage disposer, or garburator) is a device, usually electrically powered, installed under a kitchen sink between the sink's drain and the trap. The device shreds food waste into pieces small enough—generally less than 2 mm (0.079 in) in diameter—to pass through plumbing.

== History ==
The garbage disposal unit was invented in 1927 by John W. Hammes, an architect working in Racine, Wisconsin. He applied for a patent in 1933 that was issued in 1935. His InSinkErator company put his disposer on the market in 1940.

Hammes' claim is disputed, as General Electric introduced a garbage disposal unit in 1935, known as the Disposall.

In many cities in the United States in the 1930s and the 1940s, the municipal sewage system had regulations prohibiting placing food waste (garbage) into the system. InSinkErator spent considerable effort, and was highly successful in convincing many localities to rescind these prohibitions.

Many localities in the United States prohibited the use of disposers. For many years, garbage disposers were illegal in New York City because of a perceived threat of damage to the city's sewer system. After a 21-month study with the NYC Department of Environmental Protection, the ban was rescinded in 1997 by local law 1997/071, which amended section 24-518.1, NYC Administrative Code.

In 2008, the city of Raleigh, North Carolina attempted a ban on the replacement and installation of garbage disposers, which also extended to outlying towns sharing the city's municipal sewage system, but rescinded the ban one month later.

== Adoption and bans ==
In the United States, 50% of homes had disposal units as of 2009, compared with only 6% in the United Kingdom and 3% in Canada.

In Britain, Worcestershire County Council and Herefordshire Council started to subsidize the purchase of garbage disposal units in 2005, in order to reduce the amount of waste going to landfill and the carbon footprint of garbage runs. However, the use of macerators was banned for non-household premises in Scotland in 2016 in non-rural areas where food waste collection is available, and banned in Northern Ireland in 2017. They have been banned for businesses in England and Wales since 2025. The intention is to reduce water use.

Many other countries in Europe have banned or intend to ban macerators. The intention is to realize the resource value of food waste, and reduce sewer blockages.

== Rationale ==
Food scraps range from 10% to 20% of household waste, and are a problematic component of municipal waste, creating public health, sanitation and environmental problems at each step, beginning with internal storage and followed by truck-based collection. Burned in waste-to-energy facilities, the high water-content of food scraps means that their heating and burning consumes more energy than it generates; buried in landfills, food scraps decompose and generate methane gas, a greenhouse gas that contributes to climate change.

The premise behind the proper use of a disposer is to effectively regard food scraps as liquid (averaging 70% water, like human waste), and use existing infrastructure (underground sewers and wastewater treatment plants) for its management. Modern wastewater plants are effective at processing organic solids into fertilizer products (known as biosolids), with advanced anaerobic digestion facilities also capturing methane (biogas) for energy production.

== Operation ==
A high-torque, insulated electric motor, usually rated at 250–750 W (1/3–1 hp) for a domestic unit, spins a circular turntable mounted horizontally above it. Induction motors rotate at 1,400–2,800 rpm and have a range of starting torques, depending on the method of starting used. The added weight and size of induction motors may be of concern, depending on the available installation space and construction of the sink bowl. Universal motors, also known as series-wound motors, rotate at higher speeds, have high starting torque, and are usually lighter, but are noisier than induction motors, partially due to the higher speeds and partially because the commutator brushes rub on the slotted commutator.

Inside the grinding chamber there is a rotating metal turntable onto which the food waste drops. Two swiveling and two fixed metal impellers mounted on top of the plate near the edge then fling the food waste against the grind ring repeatedly. Sharp cutting edges in the grind ring break down the waste until it is small enough to pass through openings in the ring. Sometimes the waste goes through a third stage where an undercutter disc further chops it, whereupon it is flushed down the drain.

Usually, there is a partial rubber closure, known as a splashguard, on the top of the disposal unit to prevent food waste from flying back up out of the grinding chamber. It may also be used to attenuate noise from the grinding chamber for quieter operation.

There are two main types of garbage disposers—continuous feed and batch feed. Continuous feed models are used by feeding in waste after being started and are more common. Batch feed units are used by placing waste inside the unit before being started. These types of units are started by placing a specially designed cover over the opening. Some covers manipulate a mechanical switch while others allow magnets in the cover to align with magnets in the unit. Small slits in the cover allow water to flow through. Batch feed models are considered safer, since the top of the disposal is covered during operation, preventing foreign objects from falling in.

Waste disposal units may jam, but can usually be cleared either by forcing the turntable round from above or by turning the motor using a hex-key wrench inserted into the motor shaft from below. Especially hard objects accidentally or deliberately introduced, such as metal cutlery, can damage the waste disposal unit and become damaged themselves, although recent advances, such as swivel impellers, have been made to minimize such damage.

Some higher-end units have an automatic reversing jam clearing feature. By using a slightly more complicated centrifugal starting switch, the split-phase motor rotates in the opposite direction from the previous run each time it is started. This can clear minor jams, but is claimed to be unnecessary by some manufacturers: Since the early 1960s, many disposal units have utilized swivel impellers which make reversing unnecessary.

Some other kinds of garbage disposal units are powered by water pressure, rather than electricity. Instead of the turntable and grind ring described above, this alternative design has a water-powered unit with an oscillating piston with blades attached to chop the waste into fine pieces. Because of this cutting action, they can handle fibrous waste. Water-powered units take longer than electric ones for a given amount of waste and need fairly high water pressure to function properly.

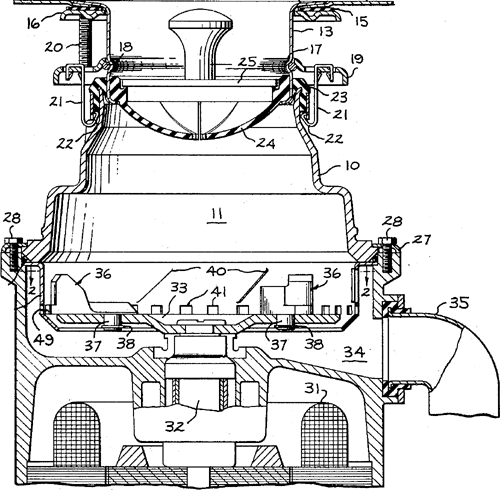
The parts of a garbage disposal

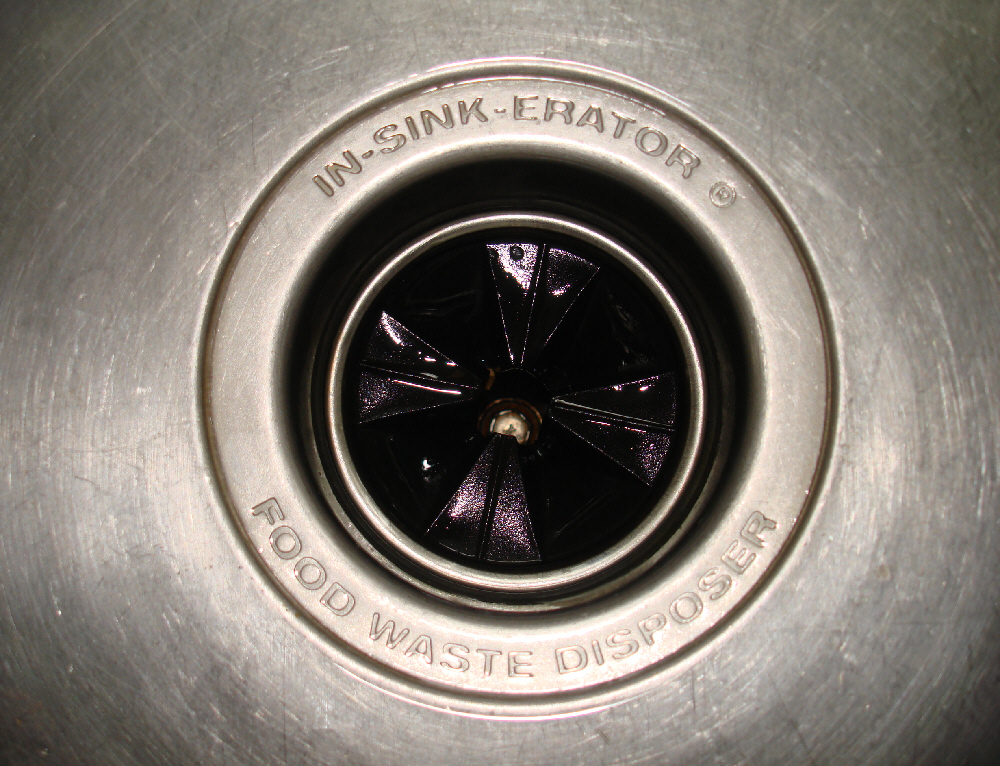
Top view of sink, with splash guard visible

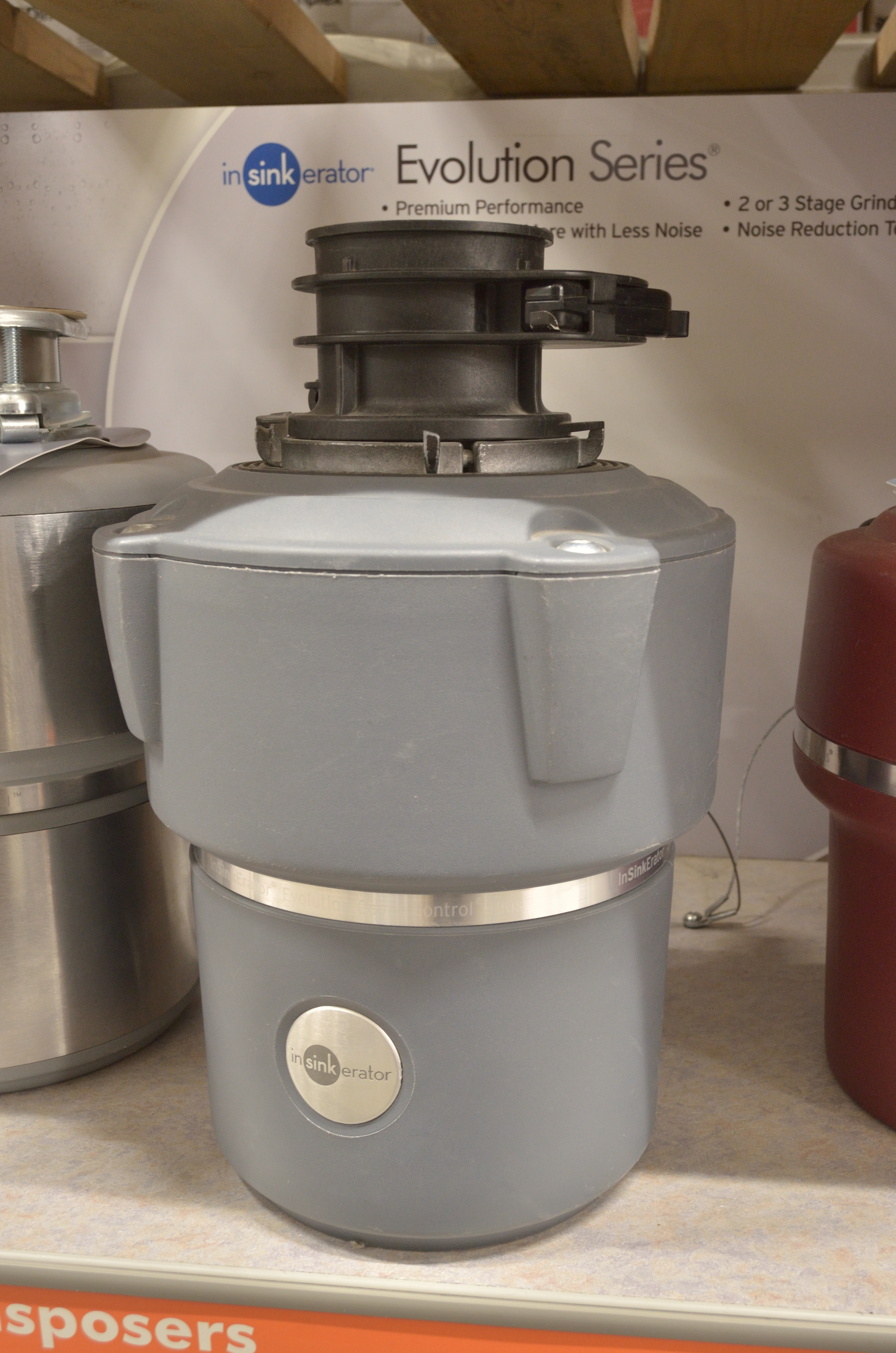
A modern disposal unit

== Environmental impact ==
Garbage disposal units icons

Kitchen waste disposal units increase the load of organic matter that reaches the water treatment plant, which in turn increases the consumption of oxygen. Metcalf and Eddy quantified this impact as 0.04 pounds (18 g) of biochemical oxygen demand per person per day where disposers are used. An Australian study that compared in-sink food processing to composting alternatives via a life-cycle assessment found that while the in-sink disposer performed well with respect to climate change, acidification, and energy usage, it did contribute to eutrophication and toxicity potentials.

This may result in higher costs for energy needed to supply oxygen in secondary operations. However, if the waste water treatment is finely controlled, the organic carbon in the food may help to keep the bacterial decomposition running, as carbon may be deficient in that process. This increased carbon serves as an inexpensive and continuous source of carbon necessary for biologic nutrient removal.

One result is larger amounts of solid residue from the waste-water treatment process. According to a study at the East Bay Municipal Utility District's wastewater treatment plant funded by the EPA, food waste produces three times the biogas as compared to municipal sewage sludge. The value of the biogas produced from anaerobic digestion of food waste appears to exceed the cost of processing the food waste and disposing of the residual biosolids (based on a LAX Airport proposal to divert 8,000 tons/year of bulk food waste).

In a study at the Hyperion sewage treatment plant in Los Angeles, disposer use showed minimal to no impact on the total biosolids byproduct from sewage treatment and similarly minimal impact on handling processes as the high volatile solids destruction (VSD) from food waste yield a minimum amount of solids in residue.

Power usage is typically 500–1,500 W, comparable to an electric iron, but only for a very short time, totaling approximately 3–4 kWh of electricity per household per year. Daily water usage varies, but is typically 1 US gallon (3.8 L) of water per person per day, comparable to an additional toilet flush. One survey of these food processing units found a slight increase in household water use.
