= Syphon recorder =

Device used to inscribe telegrams

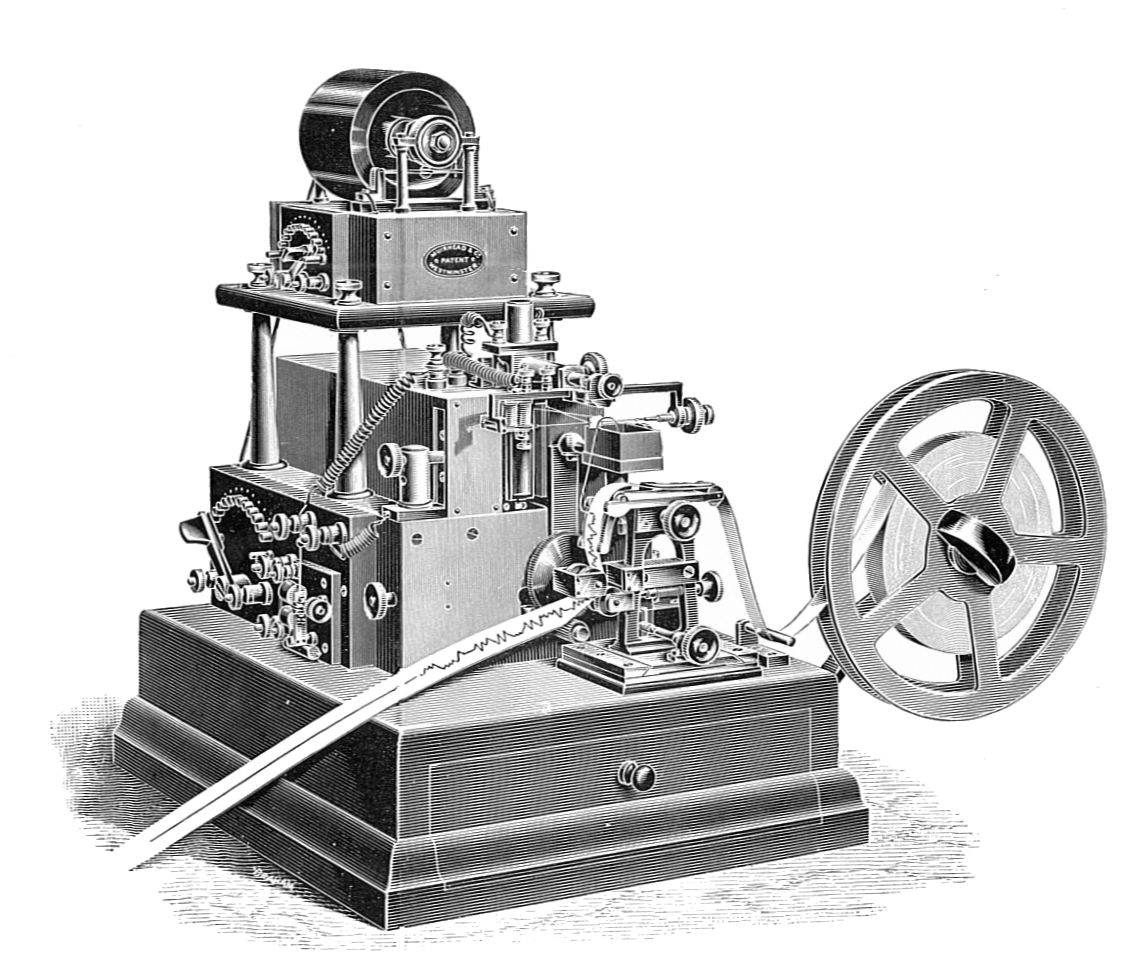
Muirhead syphon recorder

The syphon or siphon recorder is an electromechanical device formerly used as a receiver for submarine telegraph cables. It was invented by William Thomson, 1st Baron Kelvin in 1867. It automatically records an incoming telegraph message as a wiggling ink line on a roll of paper tape. Later a trained telegrapher would read the tape, translating the pulses representing the "dots" and "dashes" of the Morse code to characters of the text message.

The syphon recorder replaced Thomson’s previous invention, the mirror galvanometer as the standard receiving instrument for submarine telegraph cables, allowing long cables to be worked using just a few volts at the sending end. The disadvantage of the mirror galvanometer was that it required two operators, one with a steady eye to read and call off the signal, the other to write down the characters received. Its use spread to ordinary telegraph lines and radiotelegraphy radio receivers. A major advantage of the syphon recorder was that no operator has to monitor the line constantly waiting for messages to come in. The paper tape preserved a record of the actual message before translation to text, so errors in translation could be checked.

== Principle of operation ==
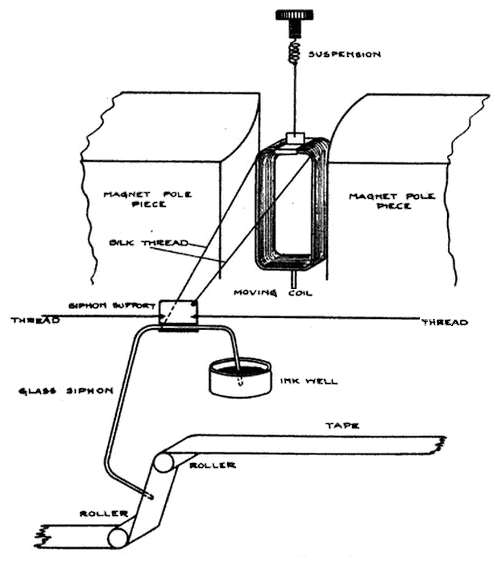
Diagram of a siphon recorder mechanism from 1922

The siphon recorder works on the principle of a d'Arsonval galvanometer. A light coil of wire is suspended between the poles of a permanent magnet so it can turn freely. The coil is attached via two wire linkages to the metal plate siphon support, which pivots on a horizontal suspension thread. From this plate a narrow glass siphon tube hangs down vertically with its end almost touching a paper tape. The paper tape is pulled by motorized rollers at a constant speed under the siphon pen. Ink is drawn up from a reservoir into the tube by siphon action and comes out a tiny orifice in the end of the siphon tube, drawing a line down the moving paper tape. In order not to affect the motion of the coil, the siphon tube itself never touches the paper, only the ink.

The current from the telegraph line is applied to the coil. The pulses of current representing the Morse code "dots" and "dashes" flowing through the coil create a magnetic field which interacts with the magnetic field of the magnet, creating a torque which causes the coil to rotate slightly about its vertical suspension axis. The wire linkages cause the siphon support plate to rotate about its horizontal axis, swinging the siphon tube across the paper tape. This draws a displacement in the ink line on the tape as long as the current is present in the coil. Thus the ink line on the tape forms a graph of the current in the telegraph line, with displacements representing the "dots" and "dashes" of the Morse code. An operator knowing Morse code later translates the line on the tape to characters of the text message, and types them onto a telegram form.

== Kelvin's electrostatic syphon ==
Example of transatlantic radiotelegraph message recorded on paper tape by a siphon recorder at RCA's receiving center in New York City in 1920.

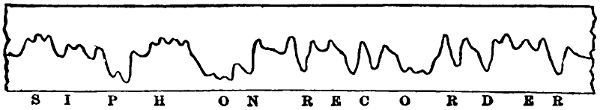
Due to poor transmission quality of long telegraph lines the paper tape was often hard to read.

The siphon and an ink reservoir are together supported by an ebonite bracket, separate from the rest of the instrument, and insulated from it. This separation permits the ink to be electrified to a high potential while the body of the instrument, including the paper and metal writing tablet, are grounded, and at low potential. The tendency of a charged body is to move from a place of higher potential to a place of lower potential, and consequently the ink tends to flow downwards to the writing tablet. The only avenue of escape for it is by the fine glass siphon, and through this it rushes accordingly and discharges itself upon the paper. The natural repulsion between its like-electrified particles causes the shower to issue in spray. As the paper moves over the pulleys a delicate hair line is marked, straight when the syphon is stationary, but curved when the siphon is pulled from side to side by the oscillations of the signal coil.

Power to pull the roll of paper tape through the syphon recorder was usually supplied by one Froment's mouse mill motors. These also drove an electrostatic machine to generate the electricity to power the syphon.

== Muirhead's vibrating recorder ==
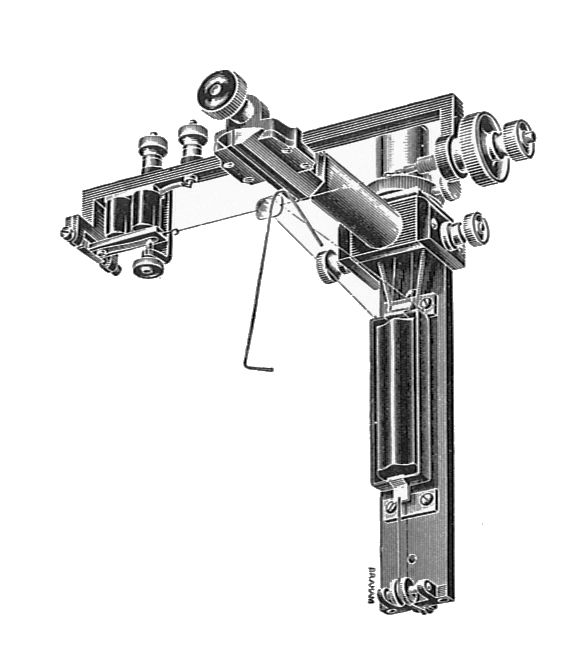
Muirhead mechanism

A simpler mechanism, operating quite differently, was developed by Alexander Muirhead. This used a vibrating pen to avoid the same problem of the ink sticking to the paper. The recording pen was suspended on a thin wire, vibrated by an electromagnet mechanism similar to that of an electric bell, to break contact with the paper.
