= Motor capacitor =

Electrical capacitor used in electric motors

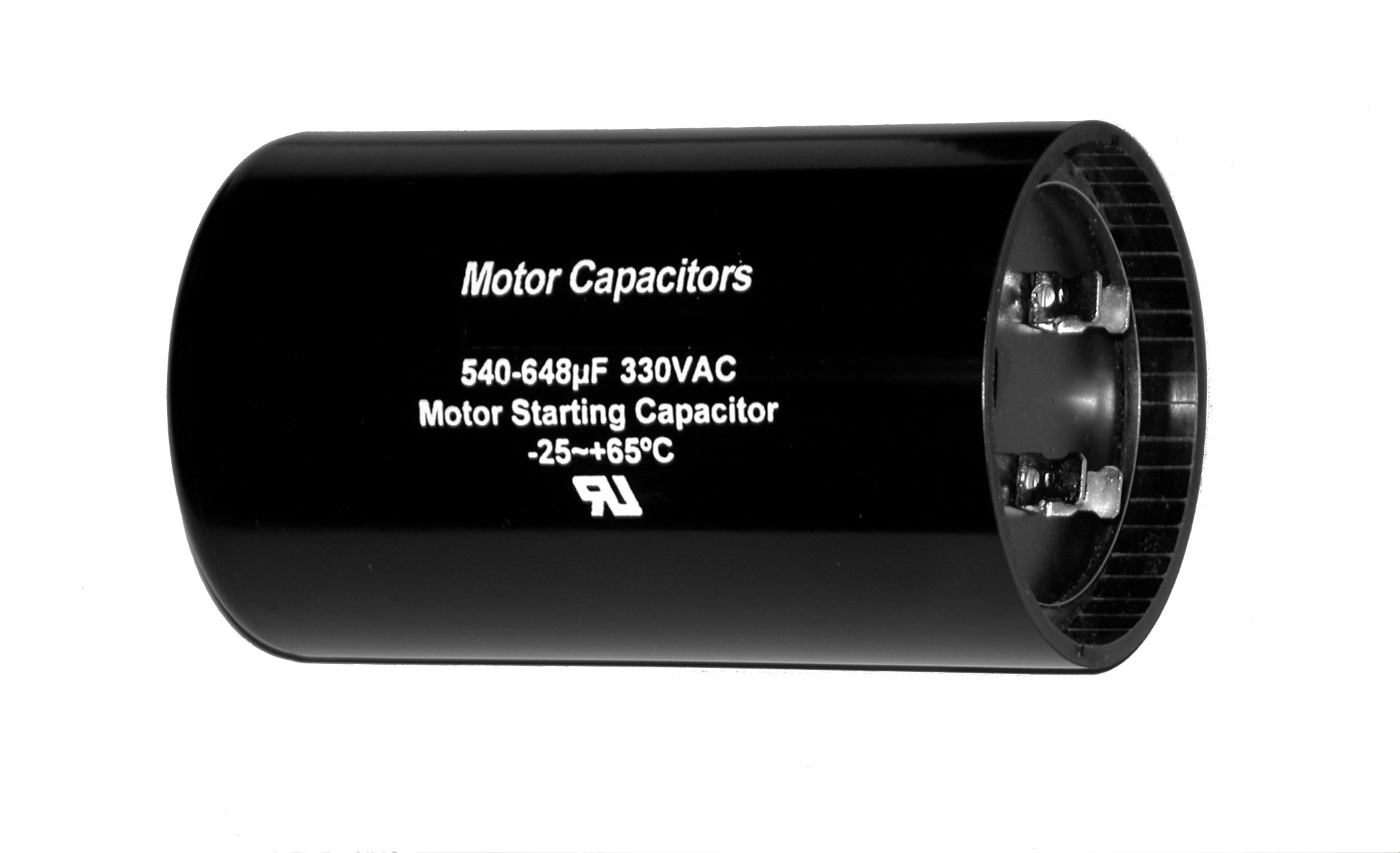
A typical motor start capacitor

A motor capacitor is an electrical capacitor that alters the current to one or more windings of a single-phase alternating-current induction motor to create a rotating magnetic field. There are two common types of motor capacitors, start capacitor and run capacitor (including a dual run capacitor).

Motor capacitors are used with single-phase electric motors that are in turn used to drive air conditioners, hot tub/jacuzzi spa pumps, powered gates, large fans or forced-air heat furnaces for example. A "dual run capacitor" is used in some air conditioner compressor units, to boost both the fan and compressor motors. Permanent-split capacitor (PSC) motors use a motor capacitor that is not disconnected from the motor.

== Start capacitors ==
Simple capacitor-start single-phase motor circuit diagram. Note that starting capacitor is connected in series with auxiliary winding just like in LC circuit.

Capacitor motor with a speed limiting governor device.

Start capacitors lag the voltage to the rotor windings creating a phase shift between field windings and rotor windings. Without the start capacitor, the north and south magnetic fields will line up and the motor hums and will only start spinning when physically turned, creating a phase shift. A start capacitor stays in the circuit long enough to rapidly bring the motor up to a predetermined speed, which is usually about 75% of the full speed, and is then taken out of the circuit, often by a centrifugal switch that releases at that speed. Afterward the motor works more efficiently with a run capacitor which makes the power factor closer to one..

Start capacitors usually have ratings above 70 μF, with four major voltage classifications: 125 V, 165 V, 250 V, and 330 V.

Start capacitors above 20 μF are always non-polarized aluminium electrolytic capacitors with non solid electrolyte and therefore they are only applicable for the short motor starting time.

The motor will not work properly if the centrifugal switch is broken. If the switch is always open, the start capacitor is not part of the circuit, so the motor does not start. If the switch is always closed, the start capacitor is always in the circuit, so the motor windings will likely burn out. If a motor does not start, the capacitor is far more likely the problem than the switch.

== Run capacitors ==
Some single-phase AC electric motors require a "run capacitor" to energize the second-phase winding (auxiliary coil) to create a rotating magnetic field while the motor is running.

Run capacitors are designed for continuous duty while the motor is powered, which is why electrolytic capacitors are avoided, and low-loss polymer capacitors are used. Run capacitors are mostly polypropylene film capacitors (historically: metallised paper capacitors) and are energized the entire time the motor is running. Run capacitors are rated in a range of 1.5 to 100 μF, with volt classifications of 250, 370 and 440 V.

If a wrong capacitance value is installed, it will cause an uneven magnetic field around the rotor. This causes the rotor to hesitate at the uneven spots, resulting in irregular rotation, especially under load. This hesitation can cause the motor to become noisy, increase energy consumption, cause performance to drop and the motor to overheat.

== Dual run capacitors ==
A dual run capacitor supports two electric motors, with both a fan motor and a compressor motor. It saves space by combining two physical capacitors into one case. The dual capacitor has three terminals, labeled C for common, FAN, and HERM for hermetically-sealed compressor.

Dual capacitors come in a variety of sizes, depending on the capacitance (measured in microfarads, μF), such as 40 plus 5 μF, and also on the voltage. A 440-volt capacitor can be used in place of a 370-volt, but not a 370-volt in place of a 440-volt. The capacitance must remain within 5% of its original value. Round cylinder-shaped dual run capacitors are commonly used for air conditioning, to help in the starting of the compressor and the condenser fan motor. An oval dual run capacitor could be used instead of a round capacitor; in either case the mounting strap needs to fit the shape used.

== Labeling ==
The units of capacitance are labeled in microfarads (μF). Older capacitors may be labeled with the obsolete terms "mfd" or "MFD", which can be ambiguous but are, especially in this context, used for microfarad as well (a millifarad is 1000 microfarads and not usually seen on motors).

== Failure modes ==
A faulty run capacitor often becomes swollen, with the sides or ends bowed or bulged out further than usual; it can then be clear to see that the capacitor has failed, because it is swollen or even blown apart causing the capacitor's electrolyte to leak out. Some capacitors have a "pressure-sensitive interrupter" design that causes them to fail before internal pressures can cause serious injury. One such design causes the top of the capacitor to expand and break internal wiring.

Over many years of use the capacitance of the capacitor drops; this is known as a "weak capacitor". As a result, the motor may fail to start or to run at full power.

When a motor is running during a lightning strike on the power grid, the run capacitor may be damaged or weakened by a voltage spike, thus requiring replacement.

IEC/EN 60252-1 2011 specifies the following levels of protection for motor run capacitors:

- S0 – no protection;
- S1, S2 – fail open-circuit or short-circuit;
- S3 – fail open-circuit only.

== Safety issues ==
=== Heat ===
A motor capacitor which is a component of a hot tub circulating pump can overheat if defective. This poses a fire hazard, and the U.S. Consumer Product Safety Commission (CPSC) has received more than 100 reports of incidents of overheating of the motor capacitor, with some fires started.

=== Toxicity ===
Motor capacitors manufactured before 1978 likely contain polychlorinated biphenyls (PCBs). These are extremely toxic and persistent chemicals with many long-lasting negative human and wildlife health effects. Capacitors were required to be labeled in the U.S. with "No PCBs" or similar language. Capacitors without these labels are suspect.

PCB containing capacitors must be replaced and disposed by consulting local environmental authorities. If these capacitors leak or fail, PCBs can be released into the environment and will very likely result in extremely expensive environmental cleanups, and potentially, lawsuits. There are extensive toxicological reports on PCBs in the research community. U.S. EPA has much information on the correct way to test and manage these toxic chemicals in older capacitors.
