= Magnetic damping =

Form of damping involving magnets and electrical conductors

Magnetic damping is a form of damping that occurs when a magnetic field (i.e. a magnet) travels some distance through or past an electrical conductor (or vice versa).

== Definition ==
When a magnetic field moves through a conductor the movement induces an eddy current in the conductor. The flow of electrons in the conductor immediately creates an opposing magnetic field which results in damping of the magnet and produces heat inside the conductor similar to heat buildup inside of a power cord during use. The amount of energy transferred to the conductor in the form of heat is equal to the change in kinetic energy lost by the magnet – the greater the loss of kinetic energy of a magnet (a product of its mass and speed), the greater the heat buildup in the conductor and the more forceful the damping effect. Eddy currents induced in conductors are much stronger as temperatures approach cryogenic levels. This allows for critical damping for cryogenic applications and testing in the aerospace industry.

== Equation ==
The differential equation of motion of a magnet dropped vertically through or near a conductor, where "M" is the mass of the magnet, "K" is the damping coefficient, "v" is the velocity, "g" is gravity and "a" is the acceleration of the magnet:

$$Ma = Mg - Kv$$

As gravitational pull increases, the magnet's acceleration as it falls will tend to increase, except to the extent that the damping coefficient the magnet is experiencing (as a result of the conductor) increases, combined with the extent that the velocity of the magnet also increases – a magnet moving or falling quickly will have its acceleration (i.e., its increase in speed as it falls) reduced more than one moving or falling more slowly, and this effect on acceleration will be even more pronounced if the damping coefficient of the conductor is high.

== Uses ==
- Compass needle damping
- Vehicle braking
- Roller coaster braking
- Elevator braking
- Speed-dependent torque (which, applied against a coil spring, makes a mechanical speedometer)
- Electricity meters
- Stabilization of mechanical gauges such as weighing scales, speedometers, and galvanometers
- Near critical damping at cryogenic temperatures

== See also ==
- Arago's rotations observed in 1824
- Eddy current brake
