= Walter Baily's Motor =

Early polyphase motor

Walter Bailys Polyphase motor (1879) marks the beginning of the development of modern polyphase motors. Mr. Bailey exhibited his invention on the Physical Society of London on June 28, 1879, on the occasion of his reading a paper entitled, "A Mode of Producing Arago's Rotations."

== Description ==
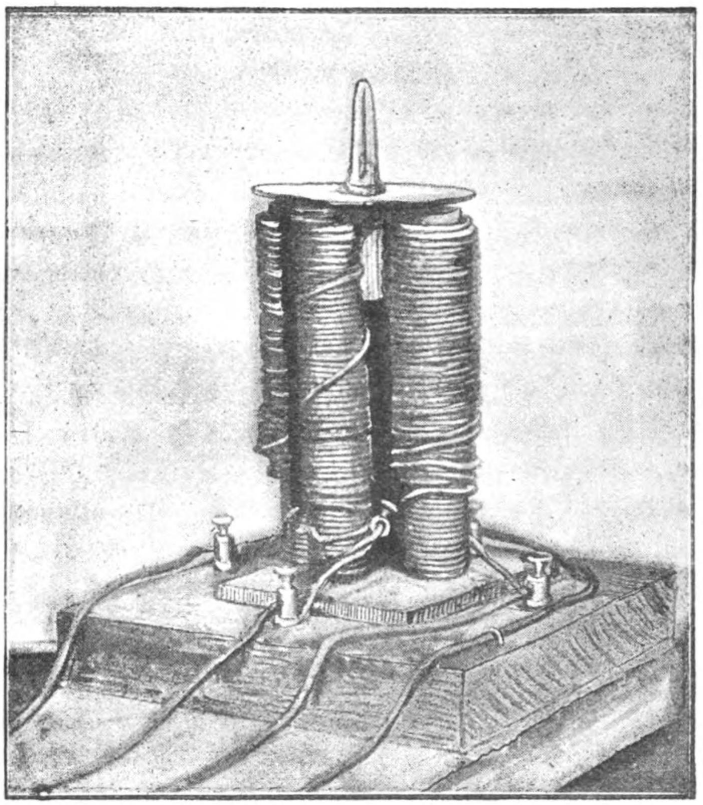
Walter Baily's Polyphase Motor (1879).

Before Baily's invention, the only mode of producing the Arago-rotations of a copper disk had been by rotating beneath it a steel magnet. Baily, instead of rotating any material magnet below the disk used a fixed electromagnet, but caused its magnetism to shift progressively between four successive poles, thus producing in the copper disk pivoted above the eddy-currents, which by their reaction gave the disk a mechanical motion in the direction of the progression of the poles.

The disk in this primitive model is about 2 3/8 inches in diameter; the four magnet cores are about 4 inches high, joined to a common yoke; and each is wound with about 150 turns of insulated copper wire 2,5 mm in diameter. The coils are connected two and two in series, like two independent horseshoe magnets set diagonally across one another. The two circuits are brought down separately to an ingenious revolving commutator built up of a simple arrangement of springs and contact strips mounted on a bit of wood, with a wire handle by which it is turned. On rotating it, the currents from two batteries are caused to be reversed alternately in the two circuits, giving rise to the following successions of polarity in the four poles and so forth.

Successive energizing of Baily motor's magnetic poles.

=== Baily's view on rotating magnetic field ===
Mr. Baily had very clear views as to how far this really represented a rotatory magnetic field. His own words are as follows:

"The rotation of the disk is due to that of the magnetic field in which it is suspended; and we should expect that if a similar motion of the field could be produced by any other means the result would be a similar motion of the disk." "Possibly the rotation of the magnet may be the only practicable way of producing a uniform rotation of the field; but it will be shown in this paper that the disk can be made to rotate by an intermittent rotation of the field effected by means of electromagnets."

The author then goes on to discuss the result of the increase in strength of a pole while a neighboring pole of the same sign decreases in strength, and suggests that if a whole circle of poles were arranged under the disk, and successively excited in opposite pairs, the series of impulses all tend to make the disk move in one direction around the axis; adding:

"In one extreme case, viz. when the number of electromagnets is infinite, we have the case of a uniform rotation of the magnetic field, such as we obtain by rotating permanent magnets."

He then returns to the case of his actual model with two pairs of poles a a' and b b' and points out that if the b b' pair are arranged to be reversed before the a a' pair, the rotation will be in one direction; whilst, if the b b' pair are reversed after the a a' pair the rotation will take place in the other direction. He goes on to show how the reversal of the direction of rotation may be effected either by reversing the action of the commutator, or by reversing the connections of one of the two batteries. The diagram accompanying the original paper suggests that the cores should be of laminated iron; but those of the actual model are solid. In a final paragraph the author remarks that the effect on the disk might be much increased by placing four other electromagnets above the disk, each opposite one of the lower magnets, and connected with it so as to present an opposing polarity.

The model runs exceedingly well when four dry cells are used to excite the electromagnets.

On the occasion, when the paper was read and the model shown, the late Prof. Guthrie asked jokingly how much power it was expected that the motor would give. To which Mr. Baily modestly replied that at present he could only regard it as a scientific toy.

== See also ==
- Arago's Rotations
- Timeline of the Electric Motor
- Rotating magnetic Field
- Induction Motor
