= AC motor =

Electric motor driven by an AC electrical input

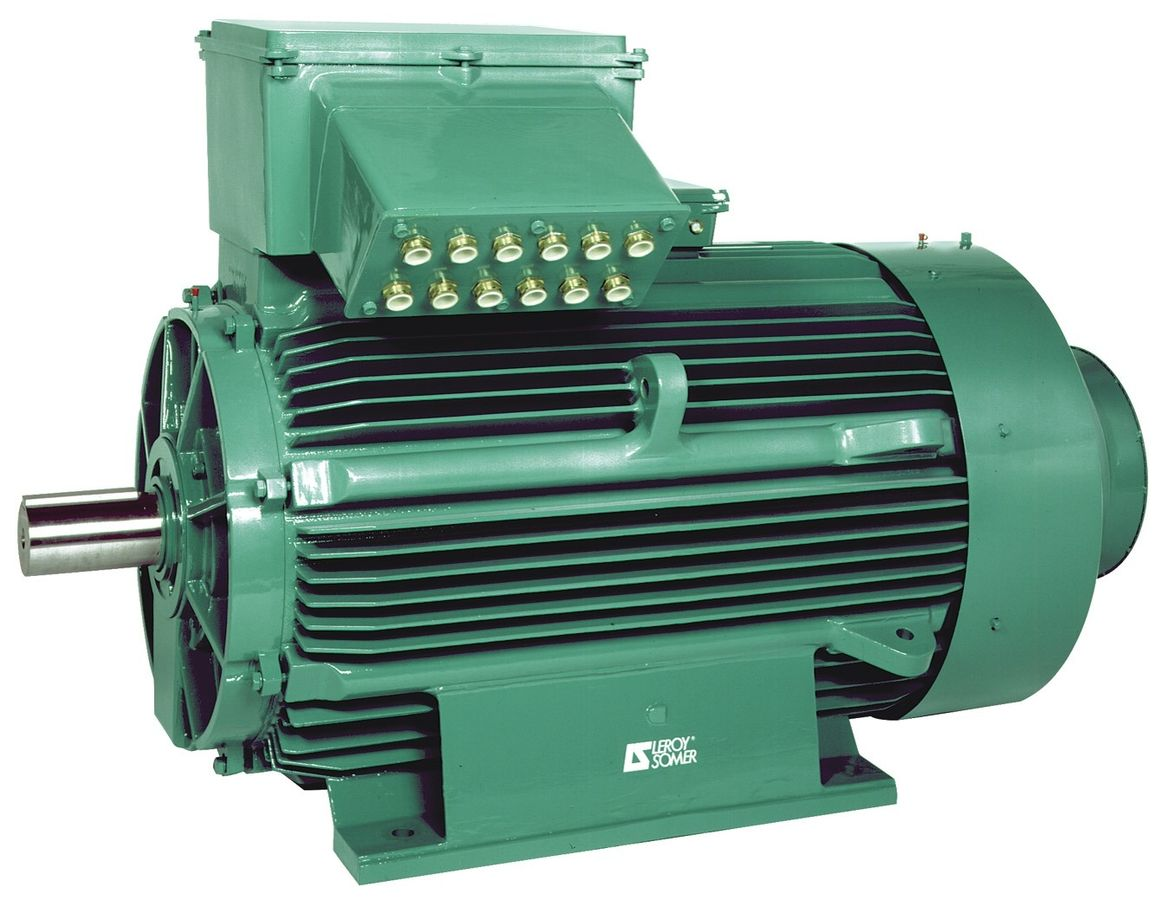
An industrial type of AC motor with electrical terminal box at the top and output rotating shaft on the left. Such motors are widely used for pumps, blowers, conveyors and other industrial machinery.

An AC motor is an electric motor driven by an alternating current (AC). The AC motor commonly consists of two basic parts, an outside stator having coils supplied with alternating current to produce a rotating magnetic field, and an inside rotor attached to the output shaft producing a second rotating magnetic field. The rotor magnetic field may be produced by permanent magnets, reluctance saliency, or DC or AC electrical windings.

Less common, AC linear motors operate on similar principles as rotating motors but have their stationary and moving parts arranged in a straight line configuration, producing linear motion instead of rotation.

== Operating principles ==
The two main types of AC motors are induction motors and synchronous motors. The induction motor (or asynchronous motor) always relies on a small difference in speed between the stator rotating magnetic field and the rotor shaft speed called slip to induce rotor current in the rotor AC winding. As a result, the induction motor cannot produce torque near synchronous speed where induction (or slip) is irrelevant or ceases to exist. In contrast, the synchronous motor does not rely on slip-induction for operation and uses either permanent magnets, salient poles (having projecting magnetic poles), or an independently excited rotor winding. The synchronous motor produces its rated torque at exactly synchronous speed. The brushless wound-rotor doubly fed synchronous motor system has an independently excited rotor winding that does not rely on the principles of slip-induction of current. The brushless wound-rotor doubly fed motor is a synchronous motor that can function exactly at the supply frequency or sub to super multiple of the supply frequency.

Other types of motors include eddy current motors, and AC and DC mechanically commutated machines in which speed is dependent on voltage and winding connection.

== History ==
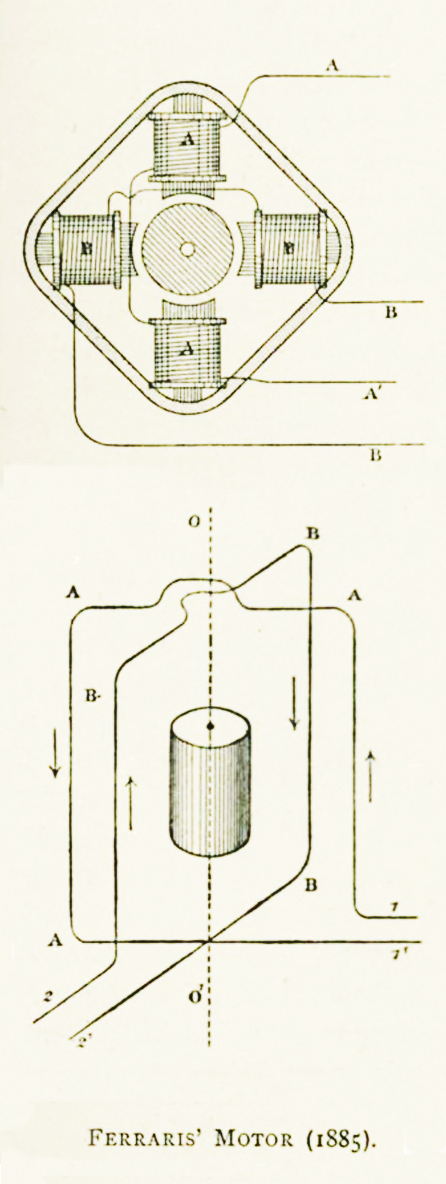
The first AC motor in the world of Italian physicist Galileo Ferraris

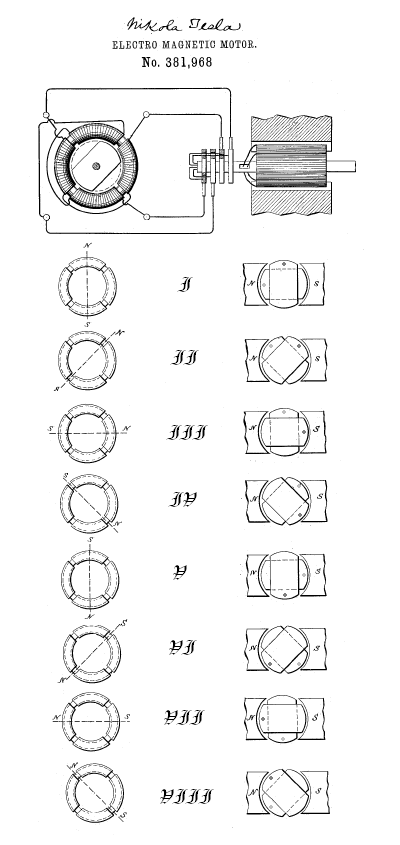
Drawing from U.S. Patent 381968, illustrating principle of Tesla's alternating current motor

Alternating current technology was rooted in Michael Faraday's and Joseph Henry's 1830–31 discovery that a changing magnetic field can induce an electric current in a circuit. Faraday is usually given credit for this discovery since he published his findings first.

In 1832, French instrument maker Hippolyte Pixii generated a crude form of alternating current when he designed and built the first alternator. It consisted of a revolving horseshoe magnet passing over two wound-wire coils.

Because of AC's advantages in long-distance high voltage transmission, there were many inventors in the United States and Europe during the late 19th century trying to develop workable AC motors. The first person to conceive of a rotating magnetic field was Walter Baily, who gave a workable demonstration of his battery-operated polyphase motor aided by a commutator on 28 June 1879, to the Physical Society of London. Describing an apparatus nearly identical to Baily's, French electrical engineer Marcel Deprez published a paper in 1880 that identified the rotating magnetic field principle and that of a two-phase AC system of currents to produce it. Never practically demonstrated, the design was flawed, as one of the two currents was “furnished by the machine itself.” In 1886, English-born American engineer Elihu Thomson built an AC motor by expanding upon the induction-repulsion principle and his wattmeter. In 1887, American inventor Charles Schenk Bradley was the first to patent a two-phase AC power transmission with four wires.

"Commutatorless" alternating current induction motors seem to have been independently invented by Galileo Ferraris and Nikola Tesla. Ferraris demonstrated a working model of his single-phase induction motor in 1885, and Tesla built his working two-phase induction motor in 1887 and demonstrated it at the American Institute of Electrical Engineers in 1888 (although Tesla claimed that he conceived the rotating magnetic field in 1882). In 1888, Ferraris published his research to the Royal Academy of Sciences in Turin, where he detailed the foundations of motor operation; Tesla, in the same year, was granted a United States patent for his own motor. Working from Ferraris's experiments, Mikhail Dolivo-Dobrovolsky introduced the first three-phase induction motor in 1890, a much more capable design that became the prototype used in Europe and the U.S. He also invented the first three-phase generator and transformer and combined them into the first complete AC three-phase system in 1891. The three-phase motor design was also worked on by the Swiss engineer Charles Eugene Lancelot Brown, and other three-phase AC systems were developed by German technician Friedrich August Haselwander and Swedish engineer Jonas Wenström.

== Induction motor ==
=== Slip ===
If the rotor of a squirrel cage motor were to run at the true synchronous speed, the flux in the rotor at any given place on the rotor would not change, and no current would be created in the squirrel cage. For this reason, ordinary squirrel-cage motors run at some tens of revolutions per minute (RPM) slower than synchronous speed. Because the rotating field (or equivalent pulsating field) effectively rotates faster than the rotor, it could be said to slip past the surface of the rotor. The difference between synchronous speed and actual speed is called slip, and loading the motor increases the amount of slip as the motor slows down slightly. Even with no load, internal mechanical losses prevent the slip from being zero.

The speed of the AC motor is determined primarily by the frequency of the AC supply and the number of poles in the stator winding, according to the relation:
$$N_{\mathrm{s}} = 120{F\over p}$$

where

- N_{s} is the synchronous speed, in revolutions per minute ();
- F is the AC power frequency, in cycles per second (hertz, Hz); and
- p is the number of poles per phase winding.

The constant 120 results from combining the conversions of 60 seconds per minute and that each phase requires 2 poles.

Actual RPM for an induction motor will be less than this calculated synchronous speed by an amount known as slip, that increases with the torque produced. With no load, the speed will be very close to synchronous. When loaded, standard motors have between 2–3% slip, special motors may have up to 7% slip, and a class of motors known as torque motors are rated to operate at 100% slip (i.e., 0 rpm, full stall).

The slip of the AC motor is calculated by:
$$S = (N_{\mathrm{s}} - N_{\mathrm{r}})/N_{\mathrm{s}}$$

where

- N_{r} is the rotational speed, in revolutions per minute; and
- S is the normalised slip ratio, ranging from 0 to 1.

As an example, a typical four-pole motor running on 60 Hz might have a nameplate rating of 1725 rpm at full load, while its calculated speed is 1800 rpm. The speed in this type of motor has traditionally been altered by having additional sets of coils or poles in the motor that can be switched on and off to change the speed of magnetic field rotation. However, developments in power electronics mean that the frequency of the power supply can also now be varied to provide a smoother control of the motor speed.

This kind of rotor is the basic hardware for induction regulators, which is an exception of the use of rotating magnetic field as pure electrical (not electromechanical) application.

=== Polyphase cage rotor ===
Most common AC motors use the squirrel-cage rotor, which will be found in virtually all domestic and light industrial alternating current motors. The squirrel-cage refers to the rotating exercise cage for pet animals. The motor takes its name from the shape of its rotor "windings"- a ring at either end of the rotor, with bars connecting the rings running the length of the rotor. It is typically cast aluminum or copper poured between the iron laminates of the rotor, and usually only the end rings will be visible. The vast majority of the rotor currents will flow through the bars rather than the higher-resistance and usually varnished laminates. Very low voltages at very high currents are typical in the bars and end rings; high efficiency motors will often use cast copper to reduce the resistance in the rotor.

In operation, the squirrel-cage motor may be viewed as a transformer with a rotating secondary. When the rotor is not rotating in sync with the magnetic field, large rotor currents are induced; the large rotor currents magnetize the rotor and interact with the stator's magnetic fields to bring the rotor almost into synchronization with the stator's field. An unloaded squirrel-cage motor at rated no-load speed will consume electrical power only to maintain rotor speed against friction and resistance losses. As the mechanical load increases, so will the electrical load – the electrical load is inherently related to the mechanical load. This is similar to a transformer, where the primary's electrical load is related to the secondary's electrical load.

This is why a squirrel-cage blower motor may cause household lights to dim upon starting, but does not dim the lights on startup when its fan belt (and therefore mechanical load) is removed. Furthermore, a stalled squirrel-cage motor (overloaded or with a jammed shaft) will consume current limited only by circuit resistance as it attempts to start. Unless something else limits the current (or cuts it off completely) overheating and destruction of the winding insulation is the likely outcome.

Many washing machines, dishwashers, larger standalone fans, compressors, etc. use some variant of a squirrel-cage motor.

=== Polyphase wound rotor ===
An alternate design, called the wound rotor motor, is used when variable speed is required. In this case, the rotor has the same number of poles as the stator and the windings are made of wire, connected to slip rings on the shaft. Carbon brushes connect the slip rings to a controller such as a variable resistor that allows changing the motor's slip rate. In certain high-power variable-speed wound rotor drives, the slip-frequency energy is captured, rectified, and returned to the power supply through an inverter. With bidirectionally controlled power, the wound rotor becomes an active participant in the energy conversion process, with the wound rotor doubly fed configuration showing twice the power density.

Compared to squirrel cage rotors, wound rotor motors are expensive and require maintenance of the slip rings and brushes, but they were the standard form for variable speed control before the advent of compact power electronic devices. Transistorized inverters with variable-frequency drive can now be used for speed control, and wound rotor motors are becoming less common.

Several methods of starting a polyphase motor are used. Where a large inrush current and high starting torque can be permitted, the motor can be started across the line, by applying full line voltage to the terminals (direct-on-line, DOL). Where it is necessary to limit the starting inrush current (where the motor is large compared with the short-circuit capacity of the supply), the motor is started at reduced voltage using either series inductors, an autotransformer, thyristors, or other devices. A technique sometimes used is star-delta (YΔ) starting, where the motor coils are initially connected in star configuration for acceleration of the load, then switched to delta configuration when the load is up to speed. This technique is more common in Europe than in North America. Transistorized drives can directly vary the applied voltage as required by the starting characteristics of the motor and load.

This type of motor is becoming more common in traction applications such as locomotives, where it is known as the asynchronous traction motor.

=== Two-phase servo motor ===
A typical two-phase AC servo-motor has a squirrel cage rotor and a field consisting of two windings:

1. a constant-voltage (AC) main winding.
2. a control-voltage (AC) winding in quadrature (i.e., 90 degrees phase shifted) with the main winding so as to produce a rotating magnetic field. Reversing phase makes the motor reverse.

An AC servo amplifier, a linear power amplifier, feeds the control winding. The electrical resistance of the rotor is made high intentionally so that the speed–torque curve is fairly linear. Two-phase servo motors are inherently high-speed, low-torque devices, heavily geared down to drive the load.

=== Single-phase induction motor ===
Single-phase motors do not have a unique rotating magnetic field like multi-phase motors. The field alternates (reverses polarity) between pole pairs and can be viewed as two fields rotating in opposite directions. They require a secondary magnetic field that causes the rotor to move in a specific direction. After starting, the alternating stator field is in relative rotation with the rotor. Several methods are commonly used:

==== Shaded-pole motor ====
A common single-phase motor is the shaded-pole motor and is used in devices requiring low starting torque, such as electric fans, small pumps, or small household appliances. In this motor, small single-turn copper "shading coils" create the moving magnetic field. Part of each pole is encircled by a copper coil or strap; the induced current in the strap opposes the change of flux through the coil. This causes a time lag in the flux passing through the shading coil, so that the maximum field intensity moves higher across the pole face on each cycle. This produces a low level rotating magnetic field which is large enough to turn both the rotor and its attached load. As the rotor picks up speed the torque builds up to its full level as the principal magnetic field is rotating relative to the rotating rotor.

A reversible shaded-pole motor was made by Barber-Colman several decades ago. It had a single field coil, and two principal poles, each split halfway to create two pairs of poles. Each of these four "half-poles" carried a coil, and the coils of diagonally opposite half-poles were connected to a pair of terminals. One terminal of each pair was common, so only three terminals were needed in all.

The motor would not start with the terminals open; connecting the common to one made the motor run one way, and connecting the common to the other made it run the other way. These motors were used in industrial and scientific devices.

An unusual, adjustable-speed, low-torque shaded-pole motor could be found in traffic-light and advertising-lighting controllers. The pole faces were parallel and relatively close to each other, with the disc centered between them, something like the disc in a watthour electricity meter. Each pole face was split, and had a shading coil on one part; the shading coils were on the parts that faced each other.

Applying AC to the coil created a field that progressed in the gap between the poles. The plane of the stator core was approximately tangential to an imaginary circle on the disc, so the travelling magnetic field dragged the disc and made it rotate.

The stator was mounted on a pivot so it could be positioned for the desired speed and then clamped in position. Placing the poles nearer to the center of the disc made it run faster, and toward the edge, slower.

==== Split-phase motor ====
Another common single-phase AC motor is the split-phase induction motor, commonly used in major appliances such as air conditioners and clothes dryers. Compared to the shaded pole motor, these motors provide much greater starting torque.

A split-phase motor has a secondary startup winding that is 90 electrical degrees to the main winding, always centered directly between the poles of the main winding, and connected to the main winding by a set of electrical contacts. The coils of this winding are wound with fewer turns of smaller wire than the main winding, so it has a lower inductance and higher resistance. The position of the winding creates a small phase shift between the flux of the main winding and the flux of the starting winding, causing the rotor to rotate. When the speed of the motor is sufficient to overcome the inertia of the load, the contacts are opened automatically by a centrifugal switch or electric relay. The direction of rotation is determined by the connection between the main winding and the start circuit. In applications where the motor requires a fixed rotation, one end of the start circuit is permanently connected to the main winding, with the contacts making the connection at the other end.

===== Capacitor start motor =====
Schematic of a capacitor start motor

A capacitor start motor is a split-phase induction motor with a starting motor capacitor inserted in series with the startup winding, creating an LC circuit which produces a greater phase shift (and so, a much greater starting torque) than both split-phase and shaded pole motors. This motor has a centrifugal switch which disconnects the capacitor once the motor has started. This motor provides high starting torque. A capacitor-start, capacitor-run motor has two separate capacitors, one for starting the motor, and another for running it, and has a centrifugal switch to disconnect the starting capacitor, or a counter electromotive force (back EMF) relay connected in parallel with the auxiliary winding of the motor. This motor provides high starting torque and high efficiency.

===== Resistance start motor =====
A resistance start motor is a split-phase induction motor with a starter inserted in series with the startup winding, creating reactance. This added starter provides assistance in the starting and initial direction of rotation. The start winding is made mainly of thin wire with fewer turns to make it high resistive and less inductive. The main winding is made with thicker wire with larger number of turns which makes it less resistive and more inductive.

===== Permanent-split capacitor motor =====
Another variation is the permanent-split capacitor (or PSC) motor. Also known as a capacitor-run motor, this type of motor uses a non-polarized capacitor with a high voltage rating to generate an electrical phase shift between the run and start windings. PSC motors are the dominant type of split-phase motor in Europe and much of the world, but in North America, they are most frequently used in variable torque applications (like blowers, fans, and pumps) and other cases where variable speeds are desired.

A capacitor with a relatively low capacitance, and relatively high voltage rating, is connected in series with the start winding and remains in the circuit during the entire run cycle. No centrifugal switch is used. Like other split-phase motors, the main winding is used with a smaller start winding, and rotation is changed by reversing the connection between the main winding and the start circuit, or by having polarity of main winding switched while start winding is always connected to a capacitor. There are significant differences, however; the use of a speed sensitive centrifugal switch requires that other split-phase motors must operate at, or very close to, full speed. PSC motors may operate within a wide range of speeds, much lower than the motor's electrical speed. Also, for applications like automatic door openers that require the motor to reverse rotation often, the use of a mechanism requires that a motor must slow to a near stop before contact with the start winding is re-established. The 'permanent' connection to the capacitor in a PSC motor means that changing rotation is instantaneous.

Three-phase motors can be converted to PSC motors by making common two windings and connecting the third via a capacitor to act as a start winding. However, the power rating needs to be at least 50% larger than for a comparable single-phase motor due to an unused winding.

== Synchronous motor ==
Three-phase system with rotating magnetic fields

=== Polyphase synchronous motor ===
If connections to the rotor coils of a three-phase motor are taken out on slip-rings and fed a separate field current to create a continuous magnetic field (or if the rotor consists of a permanent magnet), the result is called a synchronous motor because the rotor will rotate synchronously with the rotating magnetic field produced by the polyphase electrical supply. Another synchronous motor system is the brushless wound-rotor doubly fed synchronous motor system with an independently excited rotor multiphase AC winding set that may experience slip-induction beyond synchronous speeds but like all synchronous motors, does not rely on slip-induction for torque production.

The synchronous motor can also be used as an alternator.

Contemporary synchronous motors are frequently driven by solid state variable-frequency drives. This greatly eases the problem of starting the massive rotor of a large synchronous motor. They may also be started as induction motors using a squirrel-cage winding that shares the common rotor: once the motor reaches synchronous speed, no current is induced in the squirrel-cage winding so it has little effect on the synchronous operation of the motor, aside from stabilizing the motor speed on load changes.

Synchronous motors are occasionally used as traction motors; the TGV may be the best-known example of such use.

Huge numbers of three phase synchronous motors are now fitted to electric cars. They have a neodymium or other rare-earth permanent magnet.

One use for this type of motor is its use in a power factor correction scheme. They are referred to as synchronous condensers. This exploits a feature of the machine where it consumes power at a leading power factor when its rotor is over excited. It thus appears to the supply to be a capacitor, and could thus be used to correct the lagging power factor that is usually presented to the electric supply by inductive loads. The excitation is adjusted until a near unity power factor is obtained (often automatically). Machines used for this purpose are easily identified as they have no shaft extensions. Synchronous motors are valued in any case because their power factor is much better than that of induction motors, making them preferred for very high power applications.

Some of the largest AC motors are pumped-storage hydroelectricity generators that are operated as synchronous motors to pump water to a reservoir at a higher elevation for later use to generate electricity using the same machinery. Six 500-megawatt generators are installed in the Bath County Pumped Storage Station in Virginia, USA. When pumping, each unit can produce 642,800 horsepower (479.3 megawatts).

=== Single-phase synchronous motor ===
Small single-phase AC motors can also be designed with magnetized rotors (or several variations on that idea; see "Hysteresis synchronous motors" below).

If a conventional squirrel-cage rotor has flats ground on it to create salient poles and increase reluctance, it will start conventionally, but will run synchronously, although it can provide only a modest torque at synchronous speed. This is known as a reluctance motor.

Because inertia makes it difficult to instantly accelerate the rotor from stopped to synchronous speed, these motors normally require some sort of special feature to get started. Some include a squirrel-cage structure to bring the rotor close to synchronous speed. Various other designs use a small induction motor (which may share the same field coils and rotor as the synchronous motor) or a very light rotor with a one-way mechanism (to ensure that the rotor starts in the "forward" direction). In the latter instance, applying AC power creates chaotic (or seemingly chaotic) jumping movement back and forth; such a motor will always start, but lacking the anti-reversal mechanism, the direction it runs is unpredictable. The Hammond organ tone generator used a non-self-starting synchronous motor (until comparatively recently), and had an auxiliary conventional shaded-pole starting motor. A spring-loaded auxiliary manual starting switch connected power to this second motor for a few seconds.

=== Hysteresis synchronous motor ===
These motors are relatively costly, and are used where exact speed (assuming an exact-frequency AC source) and rotation with low flutter (high-frequency variation in speed) are essential. Applications included tape recorder capstan drives (the motor shaft could be the capstan), and, before the advent of crystal control, motion picture cameras and recorders. Their distinguishing feature is their rotor, which is a smooth cylinder of a magnetic alloy that stays magnetized, but can be demagnetized fairly easily as well as re-magnetized with poles in a new location. Hysteresis refers to how the magnetic flux in the metal lags behind the external magnetizing force; for instance, to demagnetize such a material, one could apply a magnetizing field of opposite polarity to that which originally magnetized the material. These motors have a stator like those of capacitor-run squirrel-cage induction motors. On startup, when slip decreases sufficiently, the rotor becomes magnetized by the stator's field, and the poles stay in place. The motor then runs at synchronous speed as if the rotor were a permanent magnet. When stopped and restarted, the poles are likely to form at different locations. For a given design, torque at synchronous speed is only relatively modest, and the motor can run at below synchronous speed. In simple words, it is lagging magnetic field behind magnetic flux.

== Other AC motor types ==
=== Universal motor and series wound motor ===
A universal motor is a design that can operate on either AC or DC power. In universal motors the stator and rotor of a brushed DC motor are both wound and supplied from an external source, with the torque being a function of the rotor current times the stator current so reversing the current in both rotor and stator does not reverse the rotation. Universal motors can run on AC as well as DC provided the frequency is not so high that the inductive reactance of the stator winding and eddy current losses become problems. Nearly all universal motors are series-wound because their stators have relatively few turns, minimizing inductance. Universal motors are compact, have high starting torque and can be varied in speed over a wide range with relatively simple controls such as rheostats and PWM choppers. Compared with induction motors, universal motors do have some drawbacks inherent to their brushes and commutators: relatively high levels of electrical and acoustic noise, low reliability and more frequent required maintenance.

Universal motors are widely used in small home appliances and hand power tools. Until the 1970s they dominated electric traction (electric, including diesel-electric railway and road vehicles); many traction power networks still use special low frequencies such as 16.7 and 25 Hz to overcome the aforementioned problems with losses and reactance. Still widely used, universal traction motors have been increasingly displaced by polyphase AC induction and permanent magnet motors with variable-frequency drives made possible by modern power semiconductor devices.

=== Repulsion motor ===
Repulsion motors are wound-rotor single-phase AC motors that are a type of induction motor. In a repulsion motor, the armature brushes are shorted together rather than connected in series with the field, as is done with universal motors. By transformer action, the stator induces currents in the rotor, which create torque by repulsion instead of attraction as in other motors. Several types of repulsion motors have been manufactured, but the repulsion-start induction-run (RS-IR) motor has been used most frequently. The RS-IR motor has a centrifugal switch that shorts all segments of the commutator so that the motor operates as an induction motor once it is close to full speed. Some of these motors also lift the brushes out of contact with source voltage regulation. Repulsion motors were developed before suitable motor starting capacitors were available, and few repulsion motors are sold as of 2005.

=== Exterior rotor ===
Where speed stability is important, some AC motors (such as some Papst motors) have the stator on the inside and the rotor on the outside to optimize inertia and cooling. Exterior rotors are also common in ceiling fan motors.

=== Sliding rotor motor ===
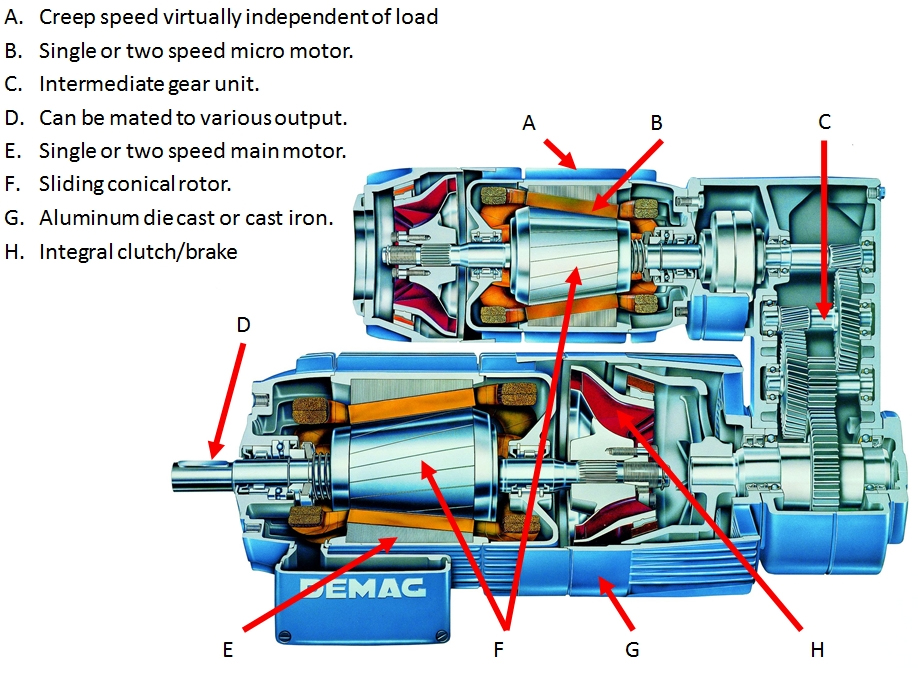
AC Motor with sliding rotors

A conical rotor brake motor incorporates the brake as an integral part of the conical sliding rotor. When the motor is at rest, a spring acts on the sliding rotor and forces the brake ring against the brake cap in the motor, holding the rotor stationary. When the motor is energized, its magnetic field generates both an axial and a radial component. The axial component overcomes the spring force, releasing the brake; while the radial component causes the rotor to turn. There is no additional brake control required.

The high starting torque and low inertia of the conical rotor brake motor has proven to be ideal for the demands of high cycle dynamic drives in applications since the motor was invented, designed and introduced over 50 years ago. This type of motor configuration was first introduced in the US in 1963.

Single-speed or two speed motors are designed for coupling to gear motor system gearboxes. Conical rotor brake motors are also used to power micro speed drives.

Motors of this type can also be found on overhead cranes and hoists. The micro speed unit combines two motors and an intermediate gear reducer. These are used for applications where extreme mechanical positioning accuracy and high cycling capability are needed. The micro speed unit combines a “main” conical rotor brake motor for rapid speed and a “micro” conical rotor brake motor for slow or positioning speed. The intermediate gearbox allows a range of ratios, and motors of different speeds can be combined to produce high ratios between high and low speed.

=== Electronically commutated motor ===
Electronically commutated (EC) motors are electric motors powered by direct-current (DC) electricity and having electronic commutation systems, rather than mechanical commutators and brushes. The current-to-torque and frequency-to-speed relationships of BLDC motors are linear. While the motor coils are powered by DC, power may be rectified from AC within the casing.

=== Watthour-meter motor ===
These are two-phase induction motors with permanent magnets to retard the rotor so its speed is accurately proportional to the power passing through the meter. The rotor is an aluminium-alloy disc, and currents induced into it react with the field from the stator.

A split-phase watthour electricity meter has a stator with three coils facing the disc. The magnetic circuit is completed by a C-shaped core of permeable iron. The "voltage" coil above the disc is in parallel with the supply; its many turns have a high inductance/resistance ratio (Q) so its current and magnetic field are the time integral of the applied voltage, lagging it by 90 degrees. This magnetic field passes down perpendicularly through the disc, inducing circular eddy currents in the plane of the disc centered on the field. These induced currents are proportional to the time derivative of the magnetic field, leading it by 90 degrees. This puts the eddy currents in phase with the voltage applied to the voltage coil, just as the current induced in the secondary of a transformer with a resistive load is in phase with the voltage applied to its primary.

The eddy currents pass directly above the pole pieces of two "current" coils under the disc, each wound with a few turns of heavy-gauge wire whose inductive reactance is small compared to the load impedance. These coils connect the supply to the load, producing a magnetic field in phase with the load current. This field passes from the pole of one current coil up perpendicularly through the disc and back down through the disc to the pole of the other current coil, with a completed magnetic circuit back to the first current coil. As these fields cross the disc, they pass through the eddy currents induced in it by the voltage coil producing a Lorentz force on the disc mutually perpendicular to both. Assuming power is flowing to the load, the flux from the left current coil crosses the disc upwards where the eddy current flows radially toward the center of the disc producing (by the right-hand rule) a torque driving the front of the disc to the right. Similarly, the flux crosses down through the disc to the right current coil where the eddy current flows radially away from the disc center, again producing a torque driving the front of the disc to the right. When the AC polarity reverses, the eddy currents in the disc and the direction of the magnetic flux from the current coils both change, leaving the direction of the torque unchanged.

The torque is thus proportional to the instantaneous line voltage times the instantaneous load current, automatically correcting for power factor. The disc is braked by a permanent magnet so that speed is proportional to torque and the disc mechanically integrates real power. The mechanical dial on the meter reads disc rotations and the total net energy delivered to the load. (If the load supplies power to the grid, the disc rotates backwards unless prevented by a ratchet, thus making net metering possible.)

In a split-phase watthour meter the voltage coil is connected between the two "hot" (line) terminals (240 V in North America) and two separate current coils are connected between the corresponding line and load terminals. No connection to the system neutral is needed to correctly handle combined line-to-neutral and line-to-line loads. Line-to-line loads draw the same current through both current coils and spin the meter twice as fast as a line-to-neutral load drawing the same current through only a single current coil, correctly registering the power drawn by the line-to-line load as twice that of the line-to-neutral load.

Other variations of the same design are used for polyphase (e.g., three-phase) power.

=== Slow-speed synchronous timing motor ===
Representative are low-torque synchronous motors with a multi-pole hollow cylindrical magnet (internal poles) surrounding the stator structure. An aluminum cup supports the magnet. The stator has one coil, coaxial with the shaft. At each end of the coil are a pair of circular plates with rectangular teeth on their edges, formed so they are parallel with the shaft. They are the stator poles. One of the pair of discs distributes the coil's flux directly, while the other receives flux that has passed through a common shading coil. The poles are rather narrow, and between the poles leading from one end of the coil are an identical set leading from the other end. In all, this creates a repeating sequence of four poles, unshaded alternating with shaded, that creates a circumferential traveling field to which the rotor's magnetic poles rapidly synchronize. Some stepping motors have a similar structure.
