= Rotating magnetic field =

Resultant magnetic field

Oscillating magnetic fields. Sine wave current in each of the three stationary coils produces three sinusoidally varying magnetic fields perpendicular to the rotation axis. The three magnetic fields add as vectors to produce a single rotating magnetic field.

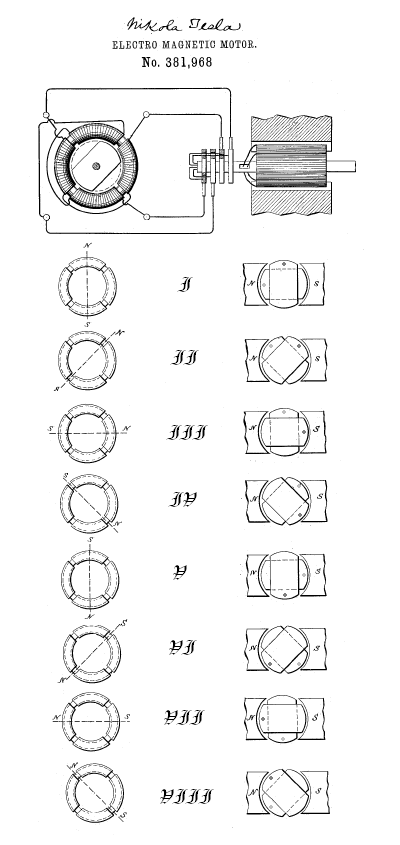
U.S. Patent 381968: Mode and plan of operating electric motors by progressive shifting; Field Magnet; Armature; Electrical conversion; Economical; Transmission of energy; Simple construction; Easier construction; Rotating magnetic field principles.

A rotating magnetic field (RMF) is the resultant magnetic field produced by a system of coils symmetrically placed and supplied with polyphase currents. A rotating magnetic field can be produced by a poly-phase (two or more phases) current or by a single phase current provided that, in the latter case, two field windings are supplied and are so designed that the two resulting magnetic fields generated thereby are out of phase.

Rotating magnetic fields are often utilized for electromechanical applications, such as induction motors, electric generators and induction regulators.

== History ==
In 1824, the French physicist François Arago formulated the existence of rotating magnetic fields using a rotating copper disk and a needle, termed "Arago's rotations." English experimenters Charles Babbage and John Herschel found they could induce rotation in Arago's copper disk by spinning a horseshoe magnet under it, with English scientist Michael Faraday later attributing the effect to electromagnetic induction. In 1879, English physicist Walter Baily replaced the horseshoe magnets with four electromagnets and, by manually turning switches on and off, demonstrated a primitive induction motor.

The idea of a rotating magnetic field in an AC motor was explored by the Italian physicist and electrical engineer Galileo Ferraris and the Serbian-American inventor and electrical engineer Nikola Tesla. Ferraris, who did research about the theory and design of alternating-current machinery, built a working model for a classroom demonstration in 1885, but did not describe it publicly until 1888. Tesla attempted several (unsuccessful) designs and working models through the early 1880s before building a working prototype in 1887 According to Ferraris principle of rotating magnetic field, Friedrich August Haselwander developed the first AC 3 phase generator in 1887. In 1888, Ferraris published his research in a paper to the Royal Academy of Sciences in Turin and Tesla obtained a United States patent (U.S. patent 0,381,968) for his design. Based on the Haselwander generator, Mikhail Dolivo-Dobrovolsky developed a three-phase generator and motor for the world's first three-phase power plant built in 1891 in Frankfurt, Germany.

== Description ==
The rotating magnetic field is the key principle in the operation of induction machines. The induction motor consists of a stator and rotor. In the stator a group of fixed windings are so arranged that a two phase current, for example, produces a magnetic field which rotates at an angular velocity determined by the frequency of the alternating current. The rotor or armature consists of coils wound in slots, which are short circuited and in which the changing flux generated by the field poles induce a current. The flux generated by the armature current reacts upon the field poles and the armature is set in rotation in a definite direction.

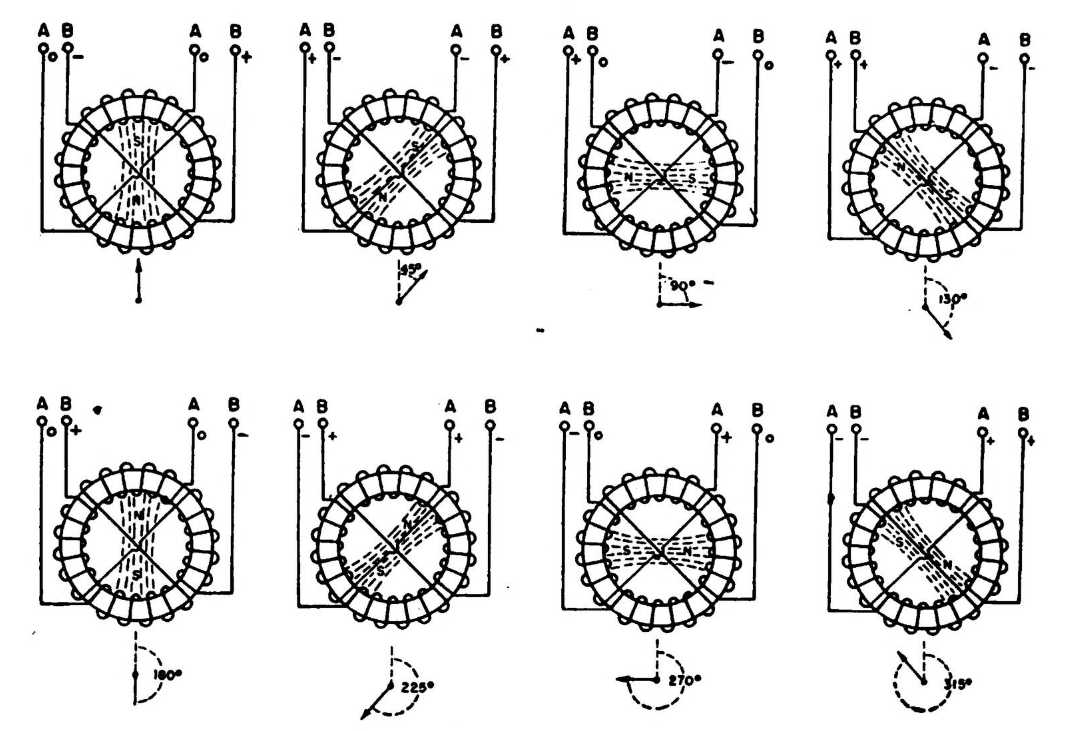
Rotating fields. As the direction of the current through the windings changes, the polarity of the windings changes as well. Since there are two windings acting in conjunction with each other, the polarity of the main field will depend upon the polarity of each winding. The arrow or vector below each diagram indicates the direction of the magnetic field in each case.

A symmetric rotating magnetic field can be produced with as few as two polar wound coils driven at 90-degree phasing. However, three sets of coils are nearly always used, because it is compatible with a symmetric three-phase AC sine current system. The three coils are driven with each set 120 degrees in phase from the others. For the purpose of this example, the magnetic field is taken to be the linear function of the coil's current.

The result of adding three 120-degree phased sine waves on the axis of the motor is a single rotating vector that always remains constant in magnitude. The rotor has a constant magnetic field. The north pole of the rotor will move toward the south pole of the magnetic field of the stator, and vice versa. This magnetomechanical attraction creates a force that will drive the rotor to follow the rotating magnetic field in a synchronous manner.

Rotating three-phase magnetic field, as indicated by the rotating black arrow

A permanent magnet in such a field will rotate so as to maintain its alignment with the external field. This effect was utilized in early alternating-current electric motors. A rotating magnetic field can be constructed using two orthogonal coils with a 90-degree phase difference in their alternating currents. However, in practice, such a system would be supplied through a three-wire arrangement with unequal currents. This inequality would cause serious problems in the standardization of the conductor size. In order to overcome this, three-phase systems are used in which the three currents are equal in magnitude and have a 120-degree phase difference. Three similar coils having mutual geometrical angles of 120 degrees will create the rotating magnetic field in this case. The ability of the three-phase system to create the rotating field utilized in electric motors is one of the main reasons why three-phase systems dominate the world's electric power-supply systems.

Rotating magnetic fields are also used in induction motors. Because magnets degrade with time, induction motors use short-circuited rotors (instead of a magnet), which follow the rotating magnetic field of a multicoiled stator. In these motors, the short-circuited turns of the rotor develop eddy currents in the rotating field of the stator, which in turn move the rotor by Lorentz force. These types of motors are not usually synchronous, but instead necessarily involve a degree of 'slip' in order that the current may be produced due to the relative movement of the field and the rotor.

== See also ==
- Dynamo theory
- Halbach array, a magnetic field that rotates spatially
- Linear motor
- Magnetic stirrer
- Electromagnetic vortex intensifier with ferromagnetic particles
- Shaded-pole motor
- Squirrel-cage rotor
- Synchronous motor
- Tesla's Egg of Columbus
- Timeline of motor and engine technology
- War of the currents
