= Electromagnetic vortex intensifier with ferromagnetic particles =

Electromagnetic vortex intensifier with ferromagnetic particles (vortex layer device, electromagnetic mill) consists of an operating chamber (pipeline) with a diameter of 60–330 mm, located inside an inductor with a rotating electromagnetic field. The operating chamber contains cylindrical ferromagnetic particles 0.5–5 mm in diameter and 5–60 mm in length, ranging from tens to several thousand pieces (0.05–20 kg), depending on the dimensions of the operating chamber of the intensifier.

== History of electromagnetic vortex intensification ==
Electromagnetic devices with a vortex layer were proposed in 1967 by D.D. Logvinenko and O.P. Shelyakov. The monograph "intensification of technological processes on devices with a vortex layer", written by these authors, showed the effective use of these devices in:

- mixing of liquids and gases
- mixing of loose materials
- dry grinding of solids (micro-resin)
- grinding and dispersion of solids in liquid media
- activation of substance surface
- implementation of chemical reactions
- changes in the physical and chemical properties of substances

Following this research, these intensifiers found their application in many researches and developments.

== Physical processes in electromagnetic vortex intensifiers ==
Intensification of technological processes and chemical reactions is achieved due to intensive mixing and dispersion, acoustic and electromagnetic treatment, high local pressure and electrolysis of processed components. Electromagnetic devices with a vortex layer with ferromagnetic elements accelerate the reactions 1.5-2 times; reduce the consumption of reagents and electricity by 20%. The grinding effect is achieved by the motion of ferromagnetic particles and their free collision with each other, and a constrained collision between the particles and a body. The degree of grinding is 0.5 μm (with an initial size of 20 mm). At present, the electromagnetic devices with a vortex layer with ferromagnetic elements actually exist (D.D. Logvinenko himself designed and produced more than 2000 pieces), their principle is also implemented in some technological lines.

== Industrial application of electromagnetic vortex intensifiers ==
Examples of industrial applications of these devices for intensifying processes are:

- preparation of food emulsions
- preparation of multicomponent suspensions with vulcanizing and gelling agents (sulfur, zinc oxide, soot, kaolin, sodium silicofluoride) in latex sponge production; Obtaining suspensions of titanium dioxide used as matting agent for chemical fibers
- wastewater treatment from acids, alkalis, hexavalent chromium compounds, nickel, iron, zinc, copper, cadmium, other heavy metals, cyanide compounds, and other contaminants
- production of greases and emulsions
- drilling fluid preparation
- preparation of kerosene in water emulsions, silicone, rubber, latex, etc.

Electromagnetic vortex intensifier grinds and regrinds coal, alumina-containing slag, quartz sand, technical diamonds, cellulose, chalk, wood flour, fluoroplastics, etc. Also, it can be used for decontamination of agricultural animal waste.

== Issues of electromechanics and device design ==
The main parameters that characterize the rotating magnetic field created by a three-phase inductor in the working area of the apparatus in the absence of ferromagnetic particles include: the number of pairs of magnetic poles, the angular speed of their rotation; magnitude and speed of rotation of the magnetic induction vector hodograph, which in real devices is an ellipse with eccentricity increasing when approaching the surface of the working chamber. It is advisable to characterize the magnetic properties of the vortex layer by volume-averaged values; a convenient parameter for energy control of the operation of the vortex layer is its power density.

Devices AVS-100, AVS-150, etc. (Russian Cyrillic acronym: АВС) are focused on uniform distribution of ferromagnetic particles throughout the working area and have a bipolar inductor. When developing an inductor for these devices, the salient-pole design of liquid steel induction rotators was chosen as an analogue. The choice of salient-pole inductor design was associated mainly with simplified manufacturing technology, ease of operation, repair and cooling.

In the central part of the working area of these devices, the magnetic field in the absence of ferromagnetic particles is close to uniform: the hodograph of the magnetic induction vector in this area is close to a circle, coinciding with it in the center of the working area of these devices; the modulus of the magnetic induction vector is approximately 0.12 T (in various devices from 0.1 to 0.15 T); the angular speed of its rotation is 314 radians per second, which corresponds to a rotation speed of 3000 rpm.

In a working vortex layer, the modulus of the averaged magnetic induction vector reaches values of 0.2 T and lags behind the external field strength by a certain phase angle.

The specific power of the vortex layer in various modes for these devices ranges from 0.1 to 1.5 kW per cubic decimeter of the working area.

The devices have dual-circuit oil-water cooling, power capacitors to compensate for the reactive power of the inductor and are powered from a 380V, 50 Hz network. Other design features of the devices are described in detail in the monograph.

Subsequently, the design of these and similar devices was mastered, modified and expanded by other manufacturers and developers. Currently, devices use both salient-pole inductors and inductors with distributed windings, similar to the stators of electric motors; different types of cooling and power capacitors are used. If necessary, the device includes power converters of voltage and frequency from the supply network. Methods for monitoring and controlling the operation of the vortex layer and technological lines based on it are also being improved.

In scientific and technical developments related to issues of the electromechanics of devices of the class under consideration, computer modelling of the inductor and behavior of ferromagnetic particles is sometimes used. An analytical model of the force effect of a circular rotating magnetic field on a magnetic particle in devices with an external electric inductor with a different number of magnetic poles is considered in the work.

Recently, a method has been proposed and examples of rapid engineering evaluation calculation and analysis of the characteristics of the working rotating magnetic field of various cylindrical inductors with a longitudinal winding have been given. A simple circular model of the magnetic state, a scheme for measuring the model parameters, and convenient formulas for estimating the magnetic characteristics, specific torque, specific power, and the level of chaos (fan-shapedness) of the vortex layer are also proposed.
