= Centrifugal switch =

Electric switch that uses the centrifugal force of a rotating shaft

- Component type: Switch

Electronic symbol

A centrifugal switch is an electric switch that operates using the centrifugal force created from a rotating shaft, most commonly that of an electric motor or gasoline engine. The switch is designed to activate or deactivate as a function of the rotational speed of the shaft.

== History ==
A 1927 patent for a centrifugal switch (US Patent #1,630,394) was granted to Royal Lee on May 31, 1927. It was the basis for the formation of the Lee Engineering Company.

== Applications ==
=== Electric motors ===
Perhaps the most common use of centrifugal switches is within single-phase, split-phase induction motors. Here, the switch is used to disconnect the starting winding of the motor once the motor approaches its normal operating speed. In this case, the centrifugal switch consists of weights mounted to the shaft of the motor and held near the shaft by spring force. At rest, levers attached to the weights press a low-friction, non-conductive plate against a set of electrical contacts mounted to the motor housing, closing the contacts and connecting the starting winding to the power source. When the motor approaches its normal operating speed, centrifugal force overcomes the spring force and the weights swing out, raising the plate away from the electrical contacts. This allows the contacts to open and disconnects the starting winding from the power source; the motor then continues operating solely using its running winding. Motors using such a centrifugal switch make a distinct clicking noise when starting and stopping as the centrifugal switch opens and closes.

A variation of the centrifugal switch used a changeover contact to ensure that the auxiliary windings remain in the circuit through a running capacitor. These motors are called two-value or capacitor start capacitor run motors.

Centrifugal switches are found in many clothes dryers, supplying power to the motor in parallel with the start switch. As long as the motor continues turning, the centrifugal switch supplies power, but if something jams in the dryer and slows it down too much, the switch will cut power.

Centrifugal switches were also used in early electric fans, particularly those made in the 1900s and early 1910s.

In aircraft, a centrifugal switch is used to control the starting and ignition circuits, the governed speed indication circuit and the overspeed protection circuit of the auxiliary power unit. This switch is mounted inside a rotating body. This can be set to activate or deactivate a circuit as the rpm of device increases or decreases.

Centrifugal switches are designed to minimize frictional contact between the rotating speed sensor and the non-rotating switch body. In most cases, this is done by having contact at low speed, which is pulled away at operating speed, so there is friction only during brief periods of start-up and slow-down. However, overspeed switches work the other way, making contact at high speed, but avoiding contact at normal operating speed.

== See also ==
- Centrifugal governor
- Transfer switch
- Governor (device) – Device used to measure and regulate the speed of a machine
