= Galileo Ferraris =

Italian physicist and electrical engineer (1847–1897)

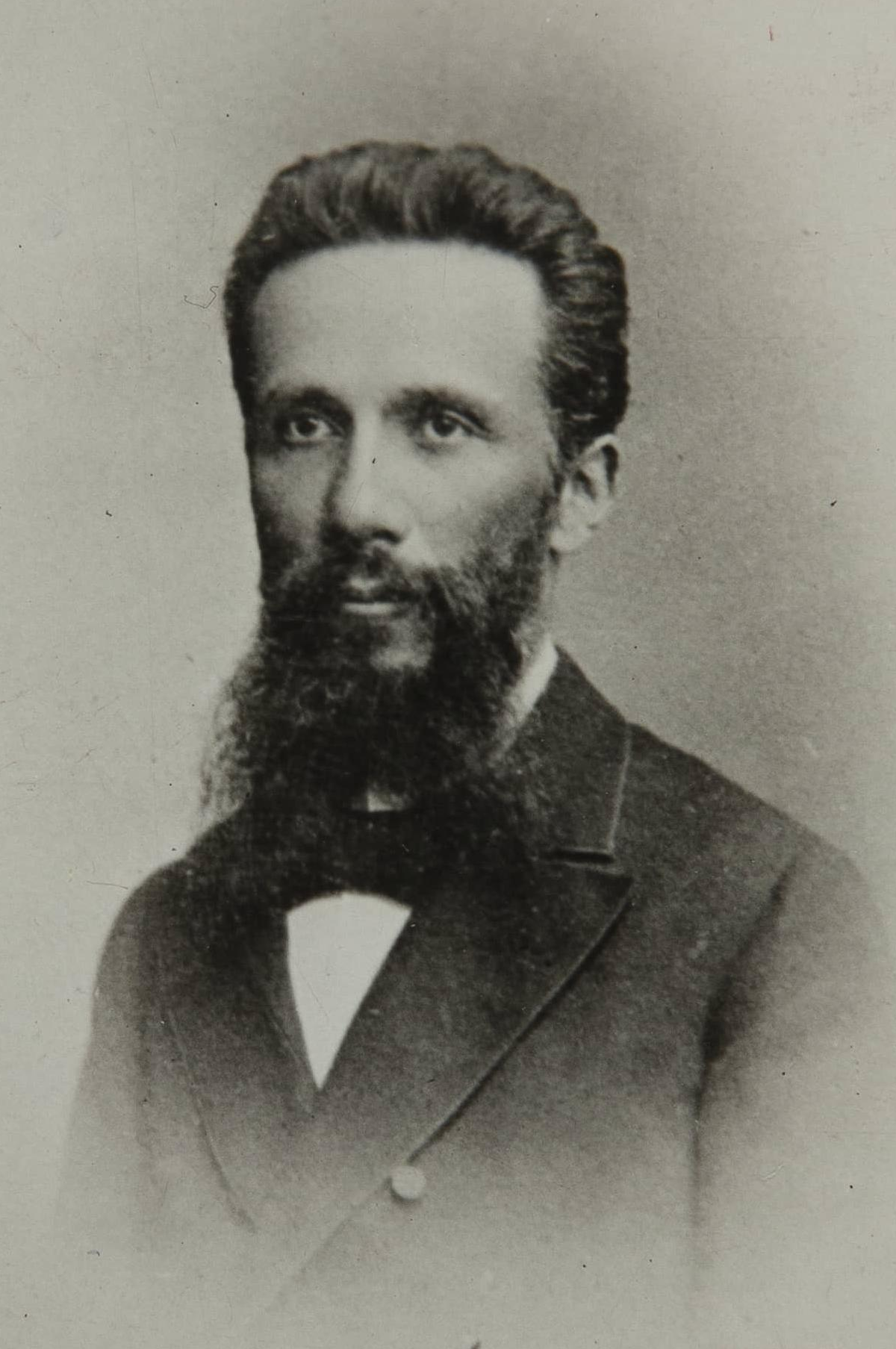
- Galileo Ferraris
- Born: 31 October 1847; Livorno Vercellese, Kingdom of Sardinia
- Died: 7 February 1897 (aged 49); Turin, Kingdom of Italy
- Known for: Alternating current Rotating magnetic field Ferraris disk Ferraris' motor
- Scientific career
- Fields: physics, engineering

Signature
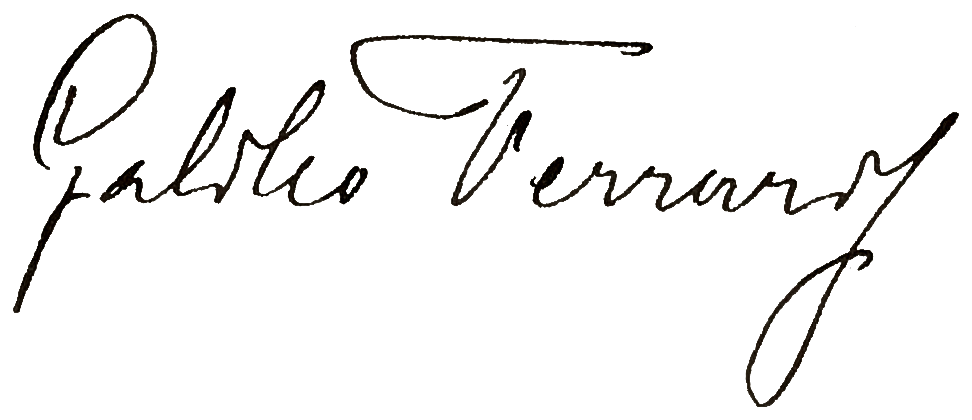

Galileo Ferraris (31 October 1847 – 7 February 1897) was an Italian university professor, physicist and electrical engineer, one of the pioneers of AC power system and inventor of the induction motor, although he never patented his work. Many newspapers touted that his work on the induction motor and power transmission systems was one of the greatest inventions of all ages. He published an extensive and complete monograph on the experimental results obtained with open-circuit transformers of the type designed by the power engineers Lucien Gaulard and John Dixon Gibbs.

== Biography ==
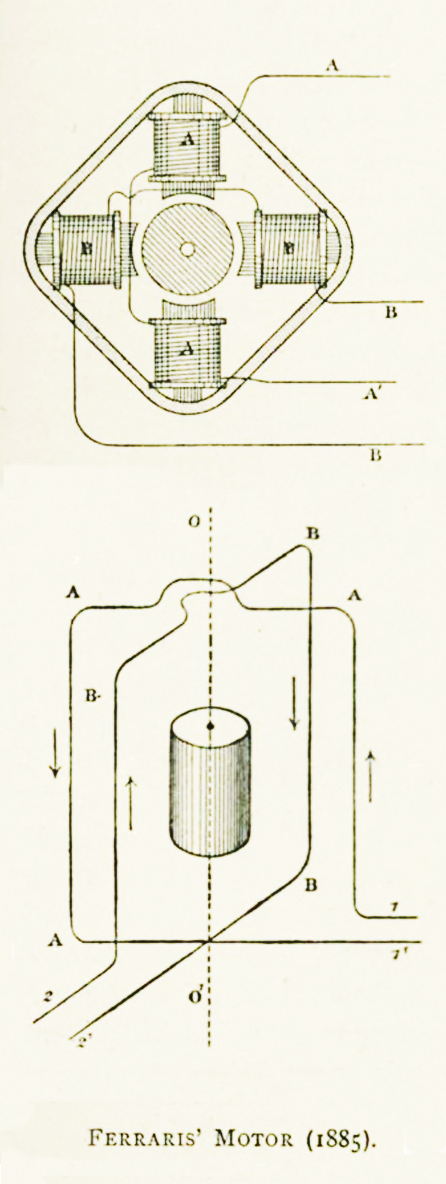
The first AC motor in the world of Italian physicist Galileo Ferraris

Born at Livorno Vercellese (Kingdom of Sardinia), Ferraris gained a master's degree in engineering and became an assistant of technical physics near the Regal Italian Industrial Museum. Ferraris independently researched the rotary magnetic field in 1885. Ferraris experimented with different types of asynchronous electric motors. The research and his studies resulted in the development of an alternator, which may be thought of as an alternating-current motor operating in reverse, so as to convert mechanical (rotating) power into electric power (as alternating current).

On 11 March 1888, Ferraris published his research in a paper to the Royal Academy of Sciences in Turin (two months later, Nikola Tesla gained U.S. patent 381,968, an application filed 12 October 1887. Serial Number 252,132). These alternators operated by creating systems of alternating currents displaced from one another in phase by definite amounts and depended on a rotating magnetic field for their operation. The resulting source of polyphase power soon found widespread acceptance. The invention of the polyphase alternator is key in the history of electrification, as is the power transformer. These inventions enabled power to be transmitted by wires economically over considerable distances. Polyphase power enabled the use of water power (via hydroelectric generating plants in large dams) in remote places, thereby allowing the mechanical energy of the falling water to be converted to electricity, which then could be fed to an electric motor at any location where mechanical work needed to be done. This versatility sparked the growth of power transmission network grids on continents around the globe.

In 1889, Ferraris worked at the Italian Industrial Institution, a school of electrical engineering (the first school of this kind in Italy, subsequently incorporated in the Politecnico di Torino). In 1896, Ferraris joined the Italian Electrotechnical Association and became the first national president of the organization.

He died early 1897 of pneumonia.

Galileo Ferraris did not confine his research interests to electricity. He also researched the fundamental properties of dioptric instruments and made an elementary representation of the theory and its applications. His work contains a detailed description of the geometric dioptrics for uncentered systems. He provided a greater generality as previously found in the telescopic system treatments, with less emphasis on applications.

In the second main section, the results obtained are applied to optical instruments. The magnification, field of view, and brightness of the instrument were dealt with in great detail. The field defined as the author of the cone opening angle, the tip of the first main points of the lens, and its base formed by the parts of the object in view, will possess the same brightness. The eye is not treated.

== Memorials ==
A Ferraris disk motor is named after its inventor.

The city of Turin honoured the contributions that Ferraris made to science. A general committee proposed an addition to the Royal Industrial Museum of Turin with a permanent monument commemorating his scientific and industrial achievements. Additionally, an avenue was named in honour of Ferraris.

In January 2021 Ferraris was honoured by the IEEE Milestones program for his contribution to "the technological innovation and excellence for the benefit of humanity", namely for his “Rotating Fields and Early Induction Motors, 1885-1888”. The according plaque carries the inscription:

Galileo Ferraris, professor at the Italian Industrial Museum (now Polytechnic) of Turin, conceived and demonstrated the principle of the rotating magnetic field. Ferraris’ field, produced by two stationary coils with perpendicular axes, was driven by alternating currents phase-shifted by 90 degrees. Ferraris also constructed prototypes of two-phase AC motors. Rotating fields, polyphase currents, and their application to induction motors had a fundamental role in the electrification of the world.

== Publications ==
- Le proprietà cardinali degli strumenti ottici. Roma: Loescher. 1877.
- Proprieta cardinali degli strumenti diottrici (in Italian). Torino: Loescher. 1877.
- Sulle applicazioni industriali della corrente elettrica (in Italian). Roma: eredi Botta. 1882.
- Sulle differenze di fase delle correnti e sulla dissipazione di energia nei trasformatori, by Prof. Galileo Ferraris (Turin, 1887).
- Fondamenti scientifici dell'elettrotecnica (in Italian). Torino: Roux Frassati & C. 1899.
- Wissenschaftliche Grundlagen der Elektrotechnik (in German). Translated by Finzi, Leo. Leipzig: Teubner. 1901.
- Opere di Galileo Ferraris, pubblicate per cura della Associazione elettrotecnica italiana. Vol. 3 vols. Milano: Ulrico Hoepli. 1902–1904.
  - Online texts (in Italian): vol. 1 vol. 2 vol. 3
