= Alexander Muirhead =

Alexander Muirhead, FRS, (26 May 1848 – 13 December 1920) born in East Saltoun, East Lothian, Scotland was an electrical engineer specialising in wireless telegraphy.

== Biography ==
Muirhead studied for his Bachelor of Science at University College London and then DSc (in electricity) at St Bartholomew's Hospital 1869–1872 where he is credited with recording the first human electrocardiogram. He was scientific adviser to his father's company, Latimer Clark, Muirhead & Co., designing precision instruments, and with H A Taylor patented a method of duplexing telegraph signals for use in submarine cables. He later worked with Sir Oliver Lodge on the development of wireless telegraphy, selling their important tuning patents to Marconi in 1912. He became a member of the Institution of Electrical Engineers in 1877, and was elected a Fellow of the Royal Society in 1904. He died at Shortlands, Kent, on 13 December 1920 and is buried at West Norwood Cemetery.
