= Arago's rotations =

Magnetic phenomenon

Fig. 1.—Arago's spinning disk

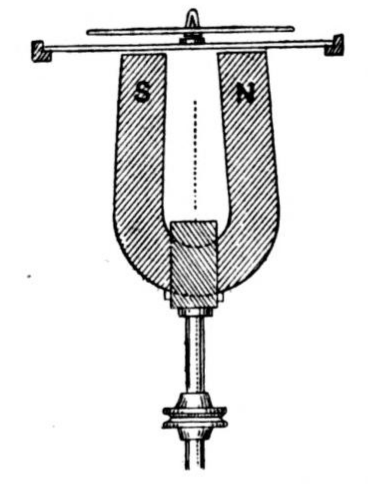
Fig. 2.—Babagge and Herschel's experiment

Fig. 3.—Slit disks used by Babbage and Herschel

Arago's rotations is an observable magnetic phenomenon that involves the interactions between a magnetized needle and a moving metal disk. The effect was discovered by François Arago in 1824. At the time of their discovery, Arago's rotations were surprising effects that were difficult to explain. In 1831, Michael Faraday introduced the theory of electromagnetic induction, which explained how the effects happen in detail.

== History ==
=== Early observations and publications ===
As has so often occurred in other branches of science, the discovery of the magnetic rotations was made nearly simultaneously by several persons, for all of whom priority has been claimed. About 1824, Gambey the celebrated instrument-maker of Paris, had made the casual observation that a compass-needle, when disturbed and set oscillating around its pivot, comes to rest sooner if the bottom of the compass-box is of copper than if it is of wood or other material. Barlow and Marsh, at Woolwich, had at the same time been observing the effect on a magnetic needle of rotating in its neighborhood a sphere of iron. Arago the astronomer, who is said to have learned of the phenomenon from Gambey, but who is also said to have independently discovered it in 1822, when working with Humboldt at magnetic determinations, was beyond question the first to publish an account of the observation, which he did verbally before the Académie des Sciences of Paris, on November 22, 1824. He hung a compass-needle within rings of different materials, pushed the needle aside to about 45°, and counted the number of oscillations made by the needle before the angle of swing decreased to 10°. In a wooden ring the number was 145, in a thin copper ring 66, and in a stout copper ring it was only 33.

=== Magnetism of rotation ===
The effect of the presence of the mass of copper is to damp the vibrations of the needle. Each swing takes the same time as before, but the amplitudes are lessened; the motion dying down, as though there were some invisible friction at work. Arago remarked that it gave evidence of the presence of a force which only existed whilst there was relative motion between the magnet-needle and the mass of copper. He gave the phenomenon the name of magnetism of rotation. In 1825 he published a further experiment, in which, arguing from the principle of action and reaction, he produced a reaction on a stationary needle by motion of a copper disk (Fig. 1). Suspending a compass-needle in a glass jar closed at the bottom by a sheet of paper or of glass, he held it over a rotating disk of copper. If the latter turns slowly the needle is simply deviated out of the magnetic meridian, tending to turn in the sense of rotation of the disk, as though invisibly dragged by it. With quicker rotation the deviation is greater. If the rotation is so swift that the needle is dragged over 90° a continuous rotation ensues. Arago found, however, that the force was not simply tangential. Suspending a needle vertically from the beam of a balance over the revolving disk he found that it was repelled when the disk was revolved. The pole which hung nearest the disk was also acted upon by radial forces tending, if the pole was near the edge of the disk, to force it radially outward, but if the pole was nearer the center, tending to force it radially inward.

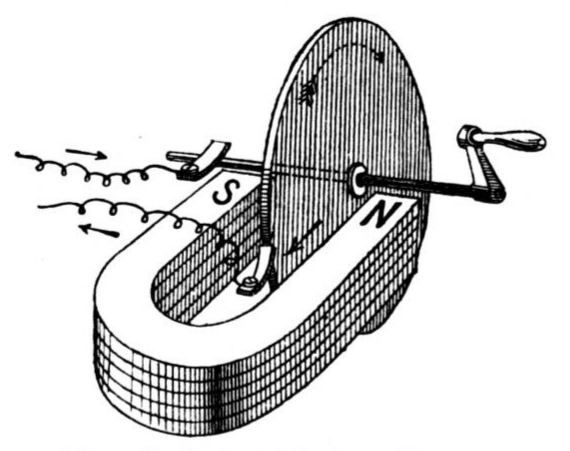
Fig. 4.—Faraday disc machine

Poisson, steeped in Coulomb's notions about magnetic action at a distance, essayed to build up a theory of magnetism of rotation, affirming that all bodies acquire a temporary magnetism in the presence of a magnet, but that in copper this temporary magnetism took a longer time to die away. In vain did Arago point out that the theory failed to account for the facts. The so-called "magnetism of rotation" threatened to become a fixed idea.

=== Investigations of the phenomena by other scientists ===
At this stage the phenomenon was investigated by several English experimenters, by Babbage and Herschel, by Christie, and, later, by Sturgeon and by Faraday. Babbage and Herschel measured the amount of retarding force exerted on the needle by different materials, and found the most powerful to be silver and copper (which are the two best conductors of electricity), after them gold and zinc, whilst lead, mercury and bismuth were very inferior in power. In 1825 they announced the successful reversal of Arago's experiment; for by spinning the magnet underneath a pivoted copper disk (Fig. 2) they had caused the latter to rotate briskly. They also made the notable observation that slits cut radially in a copper disk (Fig. 3) diminished its tendency to be rotated by the spinning magnet. If the rotatory force of the unslit disk be reckoned as 100, one radial slit reduced it to 88, two radial slits to 77, four to 48, and eight to 24. Ampère, in 1826, showed that a rotating disk of copper also exercises a turning moment upon a neighbouring copper wire through which a current is flowing. Seebeck in Germany, Prévost and Colladon in Switzerland, Nobili and Bacelli in Italy, confirmed the observations of the English experimenters, and added others. Sturgeon showed that the damping effect of a magnet pole upon a moving copper disk was diminished by the presence of a second magnet pole of contrary kind placed beside the first. Five years later he returned to the subject and came to the conclusion that the effect was an electrical disturbance, "a kind of reaction to that which takes place in electro-magnetism," when the publication of Faraday's brilliant research on magneto-electric induction, in 1831, forestalled the complete explanation of which he was in search. Faraday, in fact, showed that relative motion between magnet and copper disk inevitably set up currents in the metal of the disk, which, in turn, reacted on the magnet pole with mutual forces tending to diminish the relative motion—that is, tending to drag the stationary part (whether magnet or disk) in the direction of the moving part, and tending always to oppose the motion of the moving part. In fact, the currents go eddying round in the moving disk, unless led off by sliding contacts.

=== Experiments on eddy-currents by Faraday and Matteuci ===
This, indeed, Faraday effected, when he inserted his copper disk edgeways (Fig. 4) between the poles of a powerful magnet, and spun it, while against edge and axle were pressed spring contacts to take off the currents. The electromotive-force, acting at right angles to the motion, and to the lines of the magnetic field, produces currents which flow along the radius of the disk. If no external path is provided, the currents must find for themselves internal return paths in the metal of the disk.

Fig. 5 shows the way in which a pair of eddies is set up in a disk revolving between magnet poles. These eddies are symmetrically located on either side of the radius of maximum electromotive-force (Fig. 6).

The direction of the circulation of eddy-currents is always such as to tend to oppose the relative motion. The eddy-current in the part receding from the poles tends to attract the poles forward or to drag this part of the disk backwards. The eddy-current in the part advancing toward the poles tends to repel those poles and to be repelled by them. It is obvious that any slits cut in the disk will tend to limit the flow of the eddy-currents, and by limiting them to increase the resistance of their possible paths in the metal, though it will not diminish the electromotive-force. In the researches of Sturgeon a number of experiments are described to ascertain the directions in which the eddy-currents flow in disks. Similar, but more complete researches were made by Matteuci. The induction in rotating spheres was mathematically investigated by Jochmann, and later by Hertz.

Faraday showed several interesting experiments on eddy-currents. Amongst others he hung from a twisted thread a cube of copper in a direct line between the poles of a powerful electromagnet (Fig. 7). Before the current was turned on the cube, by its weight, untwisted the cord and spun rapidly. On exciting the magnet by switching on the current, the cube stops instantaneously; but begins again to spin as soon as the current is broken. Matteucci varied this experiment by constructing a cube of square bits of sheet copper separated by paper from one another. This laminated cube (Fig. 8) if suspended in the magnetic field by a hook a, so that its laminae were parallel to the lines of the magnetic field, could not be stopped in its rotation by the sudden turning on of the current in the electromagnet; whereas if hung up by the hook b, so that its laminations were in a vertical plane, and then set spinning, was arrested at once when the electromagnet was excited. In the latter case only could eddy-currents circulate; since they require paths in planes at right angles to the magnetic lines.

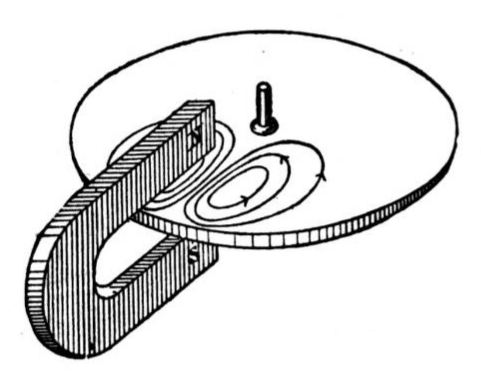
Fig. 5.—Eddy-currents in spinning disc

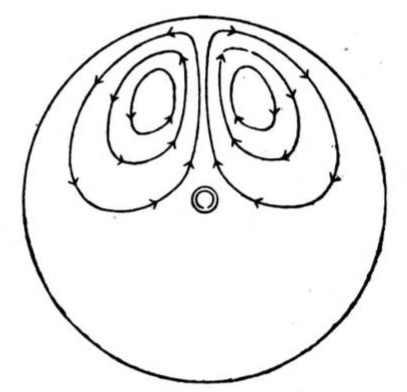
Fig. 6.—Paths of eddy-currents

With the explanation given by Faraday of the Arago rotations, as being merely due to induced eddy-currents, the peculiar interest which they excited whilst their cause was unknown, seems almost to have died out. True, a few years later some interest was revived when Foucault showed that they were capable of heating the metal disk, if in spite of the drag the rotation was forcibly continued in the magnetic field. Why this observation should have caused the eddy-currents discovered by Faraday as the explanation of Arago's phenomenon to be dubbed Foucault's currents is not clear. If anyone is entitled to the honour of having the eddy-currents named after him, it is obviously Faraday or Arago, not Foucault. A little later, Le Roux produced the paradox that a copper disk rotated between concentric magnet poles is not heated thereby, and does not suffer any drag. The explanation of this is as follows. If there is an annular north pole in front of one face of the disk, and an annular south pole in front of the other face, though there is a magnetic field produced right through the disk, there are no eddy-currents. For if all round the disk there are equal electromotive-forces directed radially inwards or radially outwards, there will be no return path for the currents along any radius of the disk. The periphery will simply take a slightly different potential from the center; but no currents will flow because the electro-motive forces around any closed path in the disk are balanced.

=== Experiments with copper plate by other scientists ===
In 1884, Willoughby Smith published an investigation on rotating metal disks in which he found iron disks to generate electromotive-forces superior to those generated in copper disks of equal size.

Guthrie and Boys in 1879 hung a copper plate over a rotating magnet by means of a torsion thread, and found that the torsion was directly proportional to the velocity of rotation. They pointed out that such an instrument was a very exact one for measuring the speed of machinery. They also made experiments upon varying the distance between the copper plate and the magnet, and varying the diameter and thickness of the copper disk.

Experiments were made upon various metals, and the torque was found to vary as the conductivity of the metal as far as the latter could be judged after being rolled into the form of plate. Messrs. Guthrie and Boys then applied the method to the measurement of the conductivity of liquids.

In 1880, De Fonvielle and Lontin observed that a lightly pivoted copper disk could be maintained in continuous rotation—if once started—by being placed, in presence of a magnet, within a coil of copper wire wound on a rectangular frame (like the coil of an old galvanometer), and supplied with alternate currents from an ordinary Ruhmkorff induction coil. They called their apparatus an electromagnetic gyroscope.

It does not seem to have occurred to anyone that the Arago rotations could be made use of in the construction of a motor prior to 1879.

== Short description of Arago's rotations ==
A magnetic needle is freely suspended on a pivot or string, a short distance above a copper disc. If the disk is stationary, the needle aligns itself with the Earth's magnetic field. If the disc is rotated in its own plane, the needle rotates in the same direction as the disc. (The effect decreases as the distance between the magnet and the disk increases.)

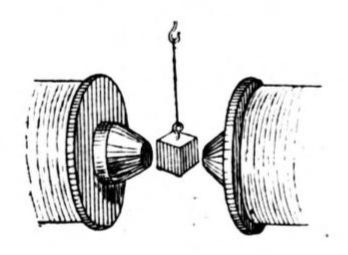
Fig. 7.—Cube of copper in powerful electromagnet

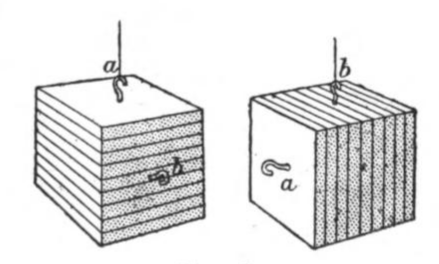
Fig. 8.—Laminated cube in a magnetic field

Variations:

- If the disk is free to rotate with minimal friction, and the needle is rotated above or below it, the disk rotates in the same direction as the needle. (This is easier to observe or measure if the needle is a larger magnet.)
- If the needle is not allowed to rotate, its presence retards rotation of the disc. (This is easier to observe or measure if the needle is a larger magnet.)
- Other non-magnetic materials having electrical conductivity (non-ferrous metals such as silver, aluminum, or zinc) also produce the effect.
- Non-conductive non-magnetic materials (wood, glass, plastic, ice, etc.) do not produce the effect.

Relative motion of the conductor and the magnet induces eddy currents in the conductor, which produce a force or torque that opposes or resists relative motion, or tries to "couple" the objects. The same drag-like force is used in eddy current braking and magnetic damping.

== See also ==
- Faraday disc
- Induction motor
- History of electromagnetic theory
