= Cornering brake control =

Cornering Brake Control (CBC) is an automotive safety measure that improves handling performance by distributing the force applied on the wheels of a vehicle while turning corners. Introduced by BMW in 1992, the technology is now featured in modern electric and gasoline vehicles such as cars, motorcycles, and trucks. CBC is often included under the Electronic Stability Control (ESC) safety feature provided by vehicle manufacturers.

CBC uses the vehicle's electronic control unit to receive data from multiple sensors. CBC then adjusts brake steer torque, brake pressure, yaw rate, and stopping distance, helping the driver keep control of the vehicle while turning both inwards and outwards.

Experimentation done with CBC technology has shown that it is an advancement on the traditional Anti Lock Braking System (ABS) featured in modern vehicles. CBC is also likely to be incorporated with future autonomous vehicles for its precision and real-time response.

== History ==
=== Early Usage ===
CBC was first introduced by the German automobile manufacturer BMW in 1992 under their new Dynamic Stability Control feature. It was included in the 1992 750i model (their 7-series sedan), and it added a further safety measure to their pre-existing ABS and Automatic Stability Control (ASC) features. When describing the feature, BMW stated, "When braking during curves or when braking during a lane change, driving stability and steering response are improved further."

While BMW was the first automobile manufacturer to create this technology, federal mandates from the EU in 2009 and the US in 2011 required the inclusion of this brake safety technology into future vehicles within these regions.

=== Current Usage ===
Federal mandates made ESC safety features required in automobile production, which included both CBC technology and functions. This has led to other manufacturers incorporating this technology under different names.

German automobile manufacturer Mercedes-Benz introduced the technology under their ESP Dynamic Cornering Assist and Curve Dynamic Assist systems. BMW-owned manufacturer Mini and British manufacturer Land Rover incorporated it under the Cornering Brake Control name. Other companies have used CBC technology as a part of their ESC feature, making CBC technology a more universal safety measure.

== Mechanical Operation ==
CBC uses the vehicle's electronic control unit and ESC to receive data from multiple sensors. These sensors calculate variables such as speed, acceleration, yaw rate, and steering angle. CBC then uses these variables to adjust brake pressure, desired yaw rate, brake steer torque, and stopping distance.

Experimentation with CBC technology has used Hardware-in-the-Loop (HiL) testing to prove its real-time response to these factors.

=== Brake Pressure ===
Wheel locking presents a severe danger to the driver while turning. Wheel locking limits the functionality of the steering function due to the centrifugal force (a force on the vehicle that shifts its balance while turning), which causes imbalances in brake pressure that CBC technology can regulate.

CBC resolves this by using an adaptive brake force system to distribute pressure amongst the brakes of a vehicle while turning. CBC then adjusts the pressure based on the speed of the vehicle and where its position is relative to its curve, optimizing its stability and traction on the road. This makes both steering and braking smoother for the driver, limiting the possibility of the vehicle's wheels locking up.

=== Yaw Rate ===
CBC technology works to stabilize the vehicle to a desired yaw rate (twisting motion), which is experienced by a vehicle while taking turns. When suddenly braking, stabilizing the yaw rate allows for brake pressure to lower easily. It also reduces the slip ratio, which is a ratio that determines the vehicle's actual speed after moving against friction (a force that resists motion). This change helps the technology accurately respond to the road's conditions as the vehicle's actual speed will accurately resemble the calculated forward and angular speed. CBC logic smoothly reaches the desired yaw rate and lateral acceleration, maximizing comfort and driving performance.

The formula to calculate the actual yaw rate is:

${\displaystyle \psi =V/R }$

where

- $\psi$ is the actual yaw rate
- $V$ is the forward velocity (the speed taken in the forward direction of the vehicle)
- $R$ is the radius turn (the distance to the center of the curve)

Depending on conditions such as vehicle model and road layout, more calculations are taken to ensure that CBC technology can effectively stabilize the vehicle. CBC can calculate a desired yaw rate that accounts for both the actual yaw rate and the required human input (measured by the vehicle's steering angle during a turn).

The formula to calculate the desired yaw rate is:

$\psi^* = \psi + k*d\delta/dt$

where

- $\psi^*$ is the desired yaw rate
- $\psi$ is the actual yaw rate
- $k$ is the scaling factor (determined by each individual vehicle make and model)
- $d\delta$ is the change of the steering angle ($\delta$) taken by the vehicle while turning
- $dt$ is the change of time ($t$)

CBC is then able to partially apply the brakes to ease the vehicle into its desired yaw rate while turning.

=== Torque Adjustment ===
CBC reduces unwanted brake steer torque when braking while turning corners. This limits the radius ($r$) found in the general formula for torque, which determines how far the vehicle is from inside the curve.

The formula to calculate torque is:

$\tau = rF\sin\theta$

where

- $\tau$ is the torque vector (with a magnitude and direction)
- $r$ is the radius from where the force is applied to where torque is measured
- $F$ is the force applied
- $\theta$ is the angle between the force applied and the radius

The change in radius keeps the vehicle from veering outward and potentially leaving the lane, compensating for the driver's error.

Modern vehicles with CBC may have their steering axis shifted sideways (towards the surface of the road) in the same direction as the tire contact point (the point where the tire meets the road). The adaptive brake force distribution is then able to distribute the pressure on the brakes by directly accounting for the tire contact force (the force that is applied back on the tires), which decreases brake steer torque.

As described in the general formula for torque, lowering brake steer torque will decrease the radius of the turn as the force ($F$) remains constant, safely keeping the vehicle from veering outward.

=== Stopping Distance ===
CBC shortens the brake distance needed to stop the vehicle while turning. CBC can lower brake pressure, yaw rate, and torque at once to limit lateral movement (movement from the sides). Limiting lateral movement helps improve vehicle stability while turning, allowing CBC to brake smoothly. This helps the driver immediately stop the vehicle when faced with an emergency situation ahead.

== Software ==
CBC has a software component that may be paired with modern ABS systems to include CBC logic. CBC software evaluates the different speeds of the vehicle's wheels and then adjusts variables such as brake steer torque to ensure the vehicle does not turn too far inward/outward, improving safety from the software side.

=== Software-in-the-Loop Testing (SiL) ===
Experimentation regarding CBC logic used Software-in-the-Loop (SiL) testing to prove its validity. This uses a simulated environment to test out the software's code in a virtual space. The algorithm used to test CBC logic incorporated many components within the vehicle, such as tires, suspension, and mass. The algorithm also modeled the driver's expected behavior and used both the predicted behavior and the vehicle components to determine the validity of CBC logic.

Results from SiL testing have clearly shown that CBC logic helps keep vehicles within their intended trajectory, enhancing the traditional ABS safety measure.

== Future Applications ==
CBC is expected to be included in autonomous vehicles as the technology can work with future vehicle control systems to ensure brake safety while turning. CBC can already autonomously engage the vehicle brakes in case of an emergency but lacks the necessary signals needed to control the vehicle without any human input. Controller Area Network or CAN signals (signals sent within the autonomous vehicle software) can send the necessary data to CBC so that the vehicle may rely on its logic and real-time response. These vehicle systems can work synonymously to increase the stability of autonomous vehicles while turning, ensuring a safe and comfortable experience for the passengers.
