= IEEE Lamme Medal =

The initially called AIEE Lamme Medal was established in 1924 by the American Institute of Electrical Engineers (AIEE) to recognize members for 'meritorious achievement in the development of electrical apparatus or machinery.' The medal was named in recognition of Benjamin G. Lamme, Westinghouse' chief engineer, who amongst others was responsible for the construction of the Niagara Falls generators.

The medal, established in accordance with Lamme's will, bears the inscription "The engineer views hopefully the hitherto unattainable."

The medal continued to be awarded as the IEEE Lamme Medal by the board of directors of the Institute of Electrical and Electronics Engineers (IEEE), after the AIEE organization merged into the IEEE in 1963. The scope was also extended to 'meritorious achievement in the development of electrical or electronic power apparatus or systems.'

The first Lamme Medal was presented in 1928 to Allan B. Field "for the mathematical and experimental investigation of eddy current losses in large slot wound conductors in electrical machinery".

The last Lamme Medal was presented in 2002. Since then, the IEEE Lamme Medal Fund has had no sponsor, and the medal has not been awarded. In 2008, the IEEE decided to discontinue this medal.

== See also ==
- Category:IEEE Lamme Medal recipients

== Sources ==
- AIEE (1929). "Lamme medal awarded to Allan B. Field". Journal of the A.I.E.E. 48 (2). Institute of Electrical and Electronics Engineers (IEEE): 154–155. doi:10.1109/jaiee.1929.6534393. ISSN 0095-9804.
