= Precision Paragon P2 =

Precision-Paragon [P2]
- Company type: Private (subsidiary of Hubbell Inc.)
- Industry: Lighting
- Predecessor: Paragon Lighting; Precision Fluorescent; Precision-Lighting
- Founded: 1992
- Headquarters: Yorba Linda, California
- Number of locations: 3 manufacturing plants
- Area served: North America
- Products: Fluorescent Lighting; LED Lighting
- Website: www.p-2.com
- Footnotes / references e.yuan (7 November 2008). "Sunovia finalizes $2 Million LED Light Engines Sale Agreement with Precision-Lighting". LED Inside. "Hubbell Acquires Varon Lighting Group". NEMA.org. 28 December 2009. "About Us". P-2.com.

Precision-Paragon [P2] is a lighting manufacturer that is wholly owned by Hubbell Lighting Inc. Headquartered in Yorba Linda, California, the company has manufacturing plants in Yorba Linda, California, Hudson, Wisconsin and Gainesville, Florida.

== Company Profile ==
Precision-Paragon [P2] manufacturers fluorescent and LED based lighting fixtures designed for energy efficient lighting retrofits and new construction of commercial and industrial buildings. Its products are designed to reduce energy consumption, and the company claims that cumulatively, its fixtures have reduced consumption by more than 12 billion kWh since 1992.

In 2011, Precision-Paragon [P2] conducted a survey among its customers which found that 75% of respondents expect the energy efficient lighting industry to grow in 2011.

== History ==
- 1992 - Company founded as Precision Fluorescent
- 2005 - Acquired by Varon Lighting Group
- 2009 - Varon Lighting Group acquired by Hubbell Incorporated
- 2009 - Precision-Lighting acquires Paragon Lighting, combined company renamed Precision-Paragon [P2].
- 2011 - Joe Martin becomes vice president and general manager of Precision-Paragon[P2]
