= Benjamin G. Lamme =

American electrical engineer

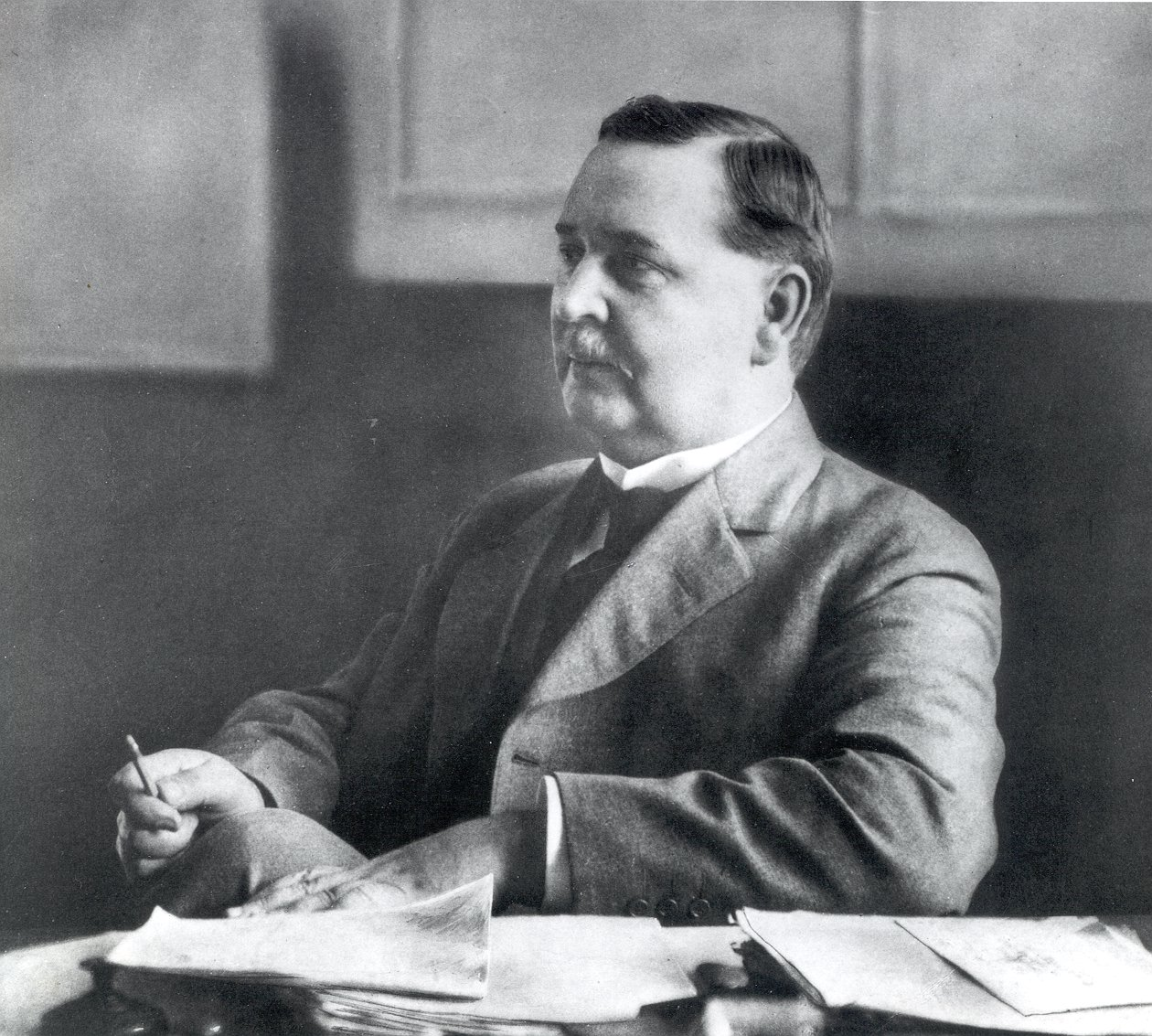
- Born: Benjamin Garver Lamme; January 12, 1864 near Springfield, Ohio
- Died: July 8, 1924 (aged 60); Pittsburgh, Pennsylvania
- Awards: IEEE Edison Medal (1918)
- Scientific career
- Fields: Electrical engineering

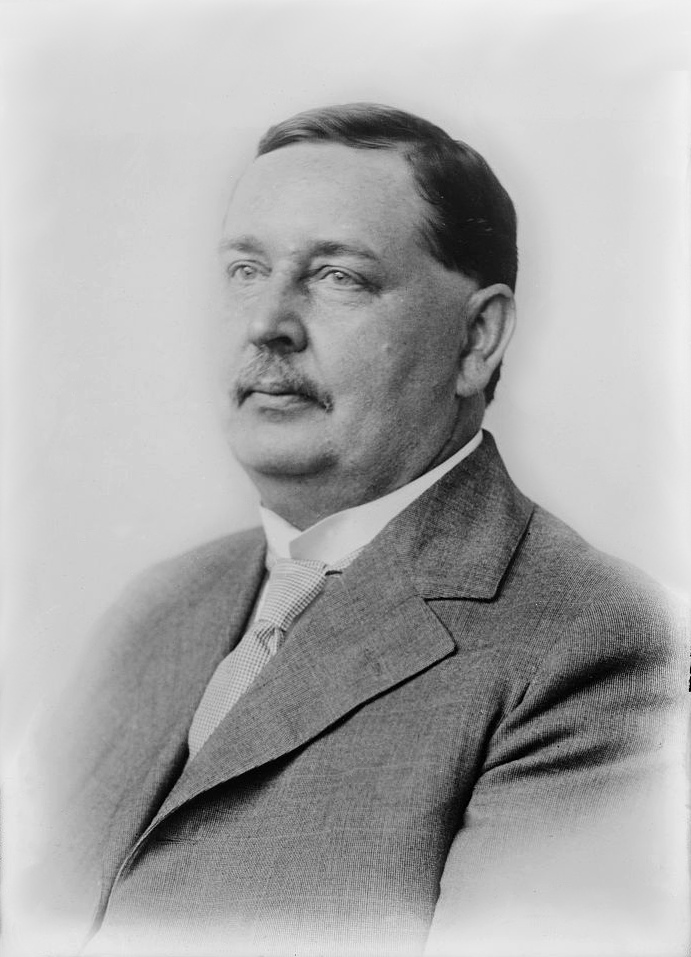
Benjamin Garver Lamme circa 1915 facing left

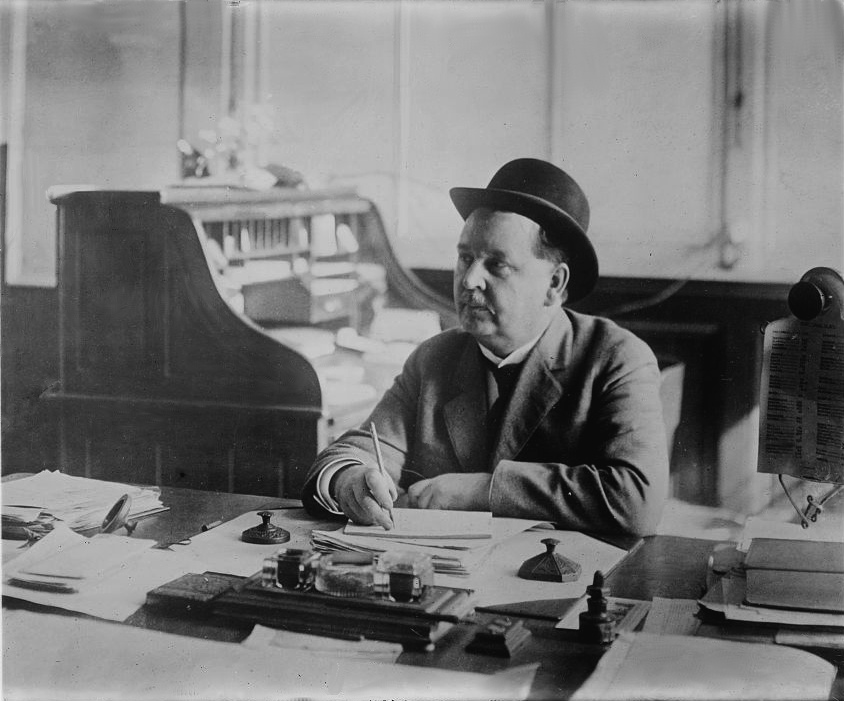

Benjamin Garver Lamme (January 12, 1864 – July 8, 1924) was an American electrical engineer and chief engineer at Westinghouse, where he was responsible for the design of electrical power machines. Lamme created an efficient induction motor from Nikola Tesla's patents and went on to design the Niagara Falls generators and motors and the power plant of the Manhattan Elevated Railway in New York City.

== Biography ==
Lamme was born on a farm near Springfield, Ohio, on 12 January 1864. From an early age he tinkered with machinery and experimented with his ideas on the Lamme family farm. He was particularly interested in things that rotated, especially at high speed. In later years he was able to solve complex problems in his engineering work using mental calculations. Lamme graduated from Olive Branch High School near New Carlisle, Ohio, in 1883 and subsequently entered Ohio State University, graduating with an engineering degree in 1888.

In early 1889, Lamme read an article about Westinghouse forming the Philadelphia Natural Gas Company of Pittsburgh. Westinghouse hired Lamme and within a few months transferred him to the Westinghouse Electric Company.

Lamme took over from Westinghouse engineer Charles F. Scott the stalled project of developing a practical version of Nikola Tesla's patented induction motor, and developed a more efficient cage winding design. Over a period of several years, he designed a variety of electrical motors and generators, inventing the damper winding. Among his eight US patents were inventions on induction motors, electrical ship propulsion, and gyroscopic stabilizer systems. He designed the single-reduction motor for street railways (replacing the double-reduction motors), the rotary converter, railroad electrification systems, and the Westinghouse Type C Induction Motor. He also designed the first 5000 kW hydroelectric generators in the Adams Power Plant at Niagara Falls, which was for many years the largest power station in the world. Bertha Lamme Feicht worked alongside her brother in the design of the turbogenerator at Niagara Falls. The plant began operating locally in 1895, and power was transmitted to Buffalo, New York, in 1896.

Lamme spent many years developing advanced analysis and computational methods for designing and predicting the performance of electrical machines, doing much of the work at night because he had other duties assigned to him during the day. As no other available employee appeared able to do the computational work, his sister Bertha, who like him had an engineering degree from Ohio State University, was recruited to aid with the computation. After a few years, she left Westinghouse to marry. The importance of Lamme's methodology was realized in 1893 when Westinghouse began designing the first Niagara Falls 5000 kW generators. Lamme designed much of the apparatus for the Westinghouse exhibit at the Columbian Exposition in Chicago in 1893, including alternating-current generators, induction motors, and rotary converters. In addition to his design work on the Niagara Falls alternators, Lamme designed the “monster machines” for the power plant of the Manhattan Elevated Railway in New York City.

Lamme became chief engineer at Westinghouse in 1903 and held the position for the rest of his life.

The New York, New Haven and Hartford Railway adopted Lamme’s single-phase electric rail system in 1905.

In 1915, Lamme was nominated by the American Institute of Electrical Engineers (AIEE, which merged into the IEEE in 1963) and was appointed by the Secretary of the Navy to represent the AIEE on the Naval Consulting Board.

Lamme died July 8, 1924, in Pittsburgh, Pennsylvania, at the age of 60. In his will, he established the AIEE Lamme Medal to recognize members of the AIEE for 'meritorious achievement in the development of electrical apparatus or machinery.' His will also provided for a gold medal to be awarded by the American Society for Engineering Education for accomplishment in technical teaching.

== Career ==
As technology advanced, one of Lamme’s responsibilities was to recruit, evaluate, and train new engineering graduates employed by the Westinghouse Company. He developed criteria for selecting the most talented persons for the design engineering work. He developed and taught the Westinghouse Engineering Course, a full-time six-month course for those selected.

== Awards ==
Lamme received the IEEE Edison Medal on May 16, 1919, in the Auditorium of the Engineering Societies Building, the predecessor of the United Engineering Building, in New York City. The citation was “For Invention and Development of Electrical Machinery.” The Edison Medal is presented for “a career of meritorious achievements in electrical science or electrical engineering or electrical arts.” On January 12, 1923, Ohio State University presented Lamme with the Joseph Sullivant Medal, the first time the award was presented.

He received the 1918 AIEE Edison Medal for his contributions to the electrical power field.

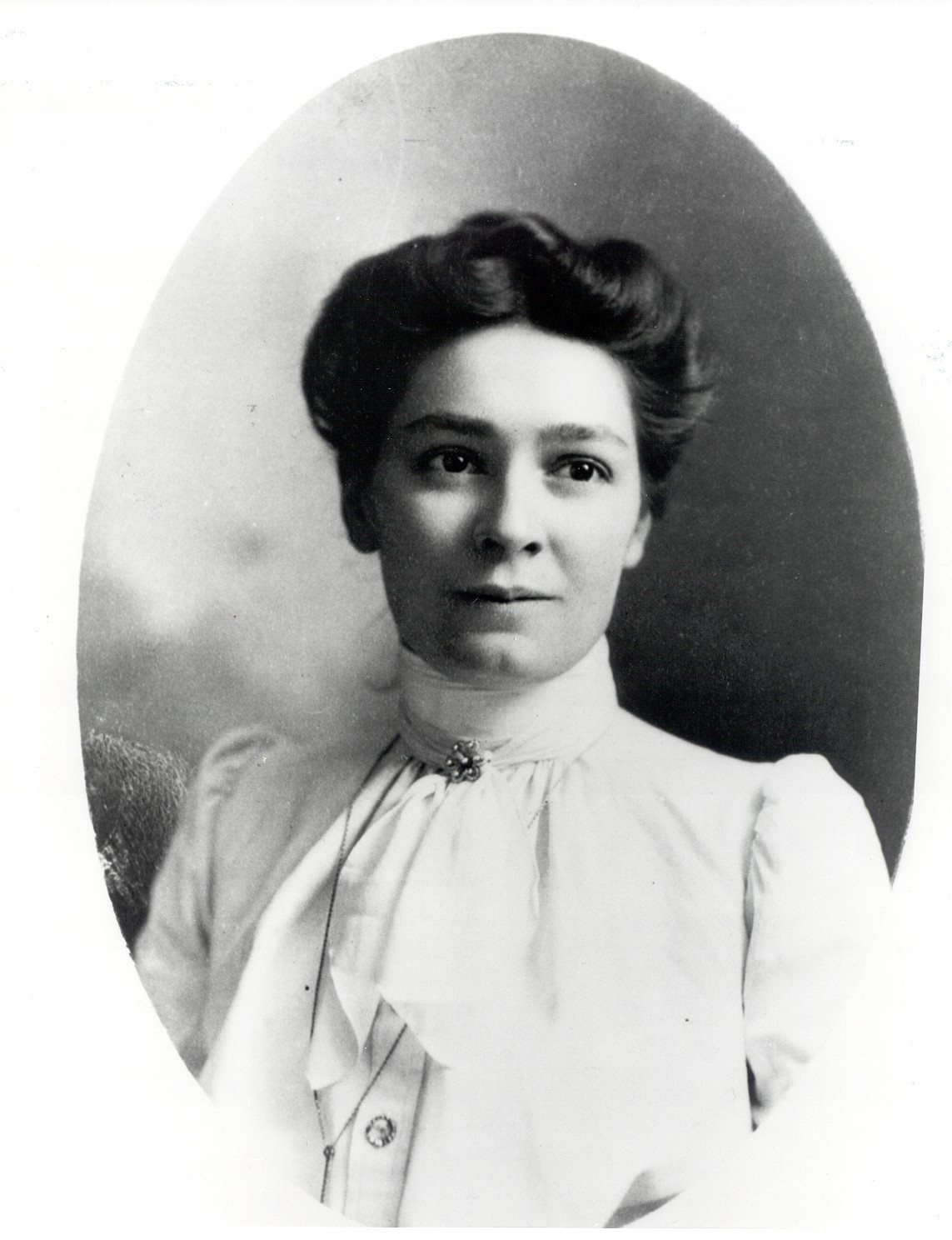
Bertha Lamme, 1892

== Personal life ==
Lamme never married and made his home with his sisters. His sister and fellow Ohio State graduate, Bertha Lamme Feicht (1869–1943), was the United States’ first woman electrical engineer and the first woman who graduated in a major field of engineering other than areas related to civil engineering. She worked at Westinghouse as an electrical design engineer under her brother’s direction until her marriage to fellow Westinghouse engineer Russel Feicht.

His friends, colleagues and family called him “B.G.” Lamme was fond of classical music and accumulated a large collection of records.

In his will he also provided that a gold medal be presented annually to a technical graduate of his alma mater, Ohio State University, for "meritorious achievement in engineering."

== Engineering papers ==
- Electrical Engineering papers (Westinghouse, Pittsburgh, 1919)

== US Patents ==
- U.S. patent 1,729,882 Control system, 1924
- U.S. patent 1,640,549 Gyroscopic stabilizer system, 1922
- U.S. patent 1,416,038 Driving system for gyroscopic stabilization, 1922
- U.S. patent 1,392,182 Means for preventing commutator flashing, 1921
- U.S. patent 1,390,624 System of electrical ship propulsion, 1921
- U.S. patent 1,387,496 Speed control for induction motors, 1921
- U.S. patent 1,336,566 Speed control for induction motors, 1920
- U.S. patent 1,333,664 Speed control for induction motors, 1920

== See also ==
- IEEE Lamme Medal

== Sources ==
- IEEE Global History Network - Benjamin G. Lamme
- The Benjamin G. Lamme Meritorious Achievement Medal
- Benjamin Garver Lamme: Electrical Engineer; an Autobiography by Benjamin Garver Lamme, Adolphus Mansfield Dudley, 1926
- Kimbark, E.W. (1995). Power System Stability. Power System Stability. John Wiley & Sons. ISBN 978-0-7803-1135-0.
