= Damper winding =

Component of electric motor or generator

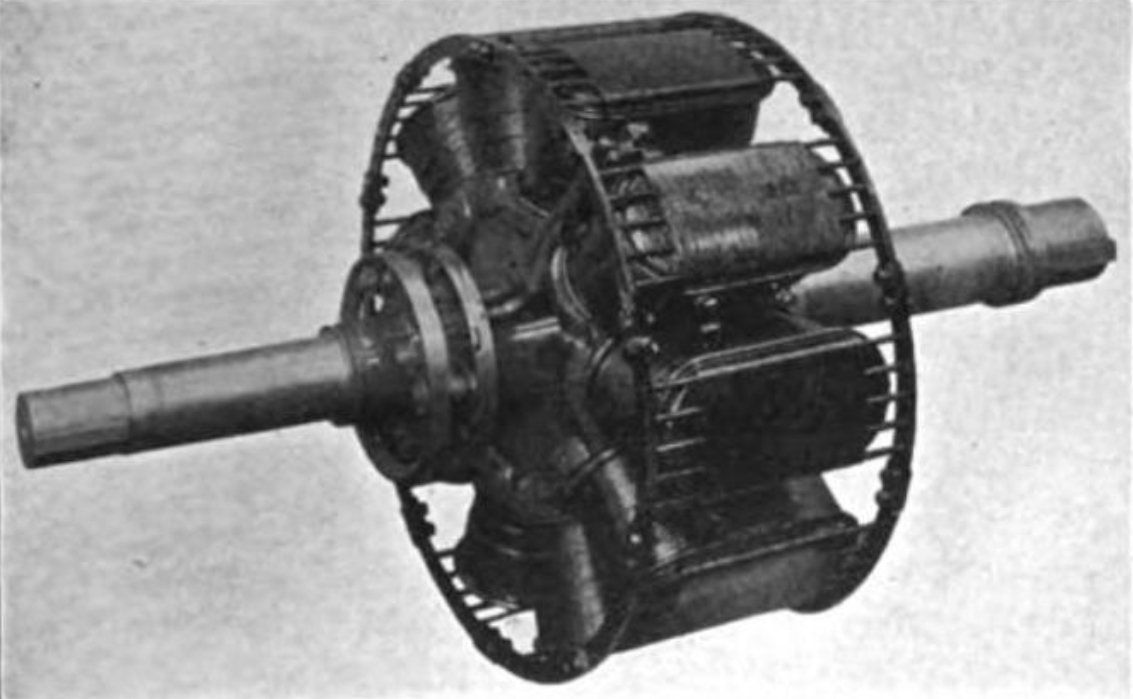
Bars and rings of the damper (amortisseur) winding of an AC generator (General Electric, early 20th century). Note the gaps in the cage along the quadrature axes.

The damper winding (also amortisseur winding) is a squirrel-cage-like winding on the rotor of a typical synchronous electric machine. It is used to dampen the transient oscillations and facilitate the start-up operation.

Since the design of a damper winding is similar to that of an asynchronous motor, the winding technically enables the direct-on-line start and can even be used for the motor operation in the asynchronous mode.

Originally the damper winding was invented by Maurice Leblanc in France and Benjamin G. Lamme in the US to deal with the problem of hunting oscillations due to the early generators being driven by the directly connected steam engines with their pulsating torque. In the modern designs the generators are driven by turbines and the issue of hunting is less important, although pulsating torque is still encountered by motors, for example, while driving the piston compressors.

The construction of the damper windings is complex and largely based on empirical knowledge. A typical damper winding consists of short-circuit bars that in the machines with cylindrical rotors share the slots with the field windings, and in the case of salient pole rotors are located in the dedicated slots on the surfaces of pole shoes. There are no bars in the quadrature axis area of the salient pole machines. The bars are terminated on rings or plates encircling the rotor.

== Sources ==
- Kimbark, E.W. (1995). Power System Stability. Power System Stability. John Wiley & Sons. ISBN 978-0-7803-1135-0.
- Pyrhonen, J.; Jokinen, T.; Hrabovcova, V. (2013). "Damper Windings". Design of Rotating Electrical Machines. Wiley. ISBN 978-1-118-70165-2.
- Klempner, G.; Kerszenbaum, I. (2004). "Amortisseur Winding". Operation and Maintenance of Large Turbo-Generators. IEEE Press Series on Power Engineering. Wiley. ISBN 978-0-471-61447-0.
