= Bryant Electric Company =

- Type: Private
- Industry: Electrical components, Switches
- Founded: 1888; 138 years ago
- Defunct: 1988; 38 years ago
- Fate: Acquired by Hubbell Incorporated
- Successor: Hubbell Incorporated
- Headquarters: Bridgeport, Connecticut
- Key people: Waldo Calvin Bryant, Founder
- Number of employees: 1,600
- Parent: Westinghouse Electric Corporation (1901-1927)

The Bryant Electric Company was a manufacturer of wiring devices, electrical components, and switches founded in 1888 in Bridgeport, Connecticut. It grew to become for a time both the world's largest plant devoted to the manufacture of wiring devices and Bridgeport's largest employer and was involved in a number of notable strikes, before being closed in 1988 and having its remaining interests sold to Hubbell in 1991.

== Founding and growth ==
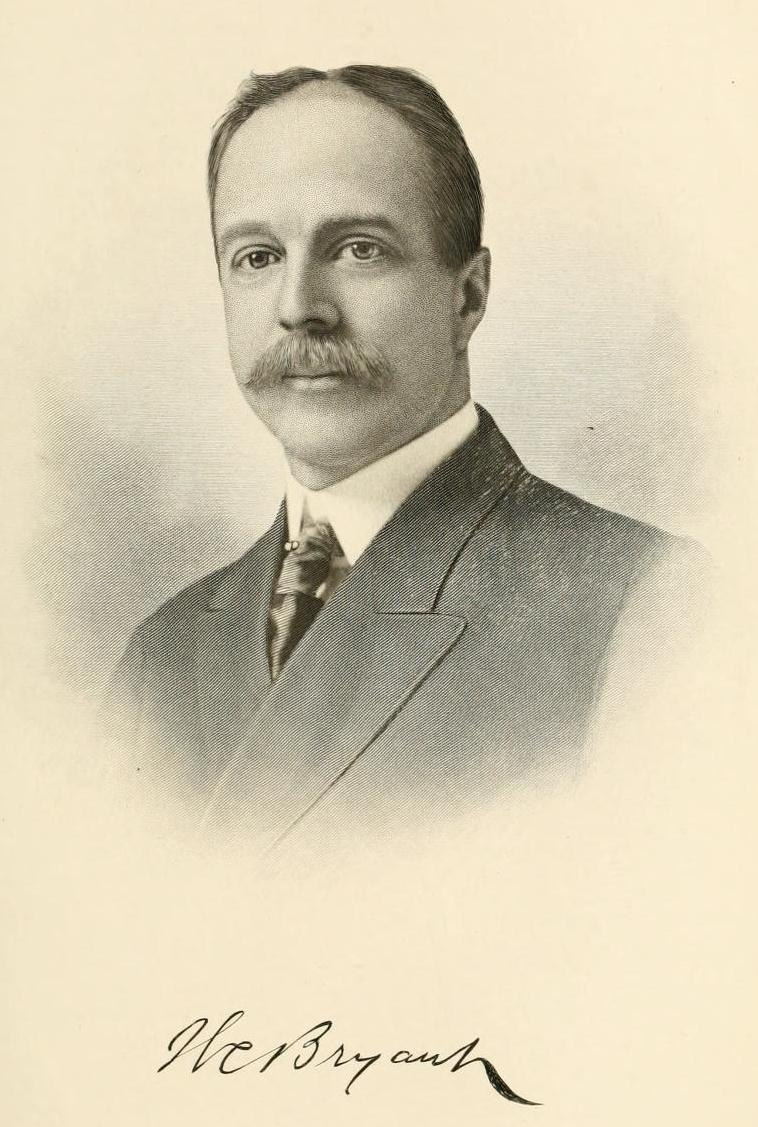
Waldo C. Bryant

Bryant was founded by Waldo Calvin Bryant in 1888 (incorporated 1889) in Bridgeport, Connecticut, with seven employees working in a loft on John Street in Bridgeport. Waldo Bryant and others at Bryant invented and patented a number of switch and electrical component designs, including "the first push-pull switch". Although responsible for more than 500 patents by 1935, Bryant's most significant contribution to the wiring devices industry was the idea of standardization. For example, in 1888 there were eight different types of electrical light bases. Bryant led the industry to accept standardized devices.

Bryant grew quickly and, in 1890, acquired the Standard Electric Time Company and Empire China Works. In 1891, Bryant relocated to a former school building owned by P. T. Barnum off State Street and, by 1905, employed 700 people. Perkins Electric Switch Company was acquired in 1899, with the employees and plant relocating to Bridgeport. Waldo Bryant needed more capital for expansion and sold the majority interest to Westinghouse Electric in 1901, though he continued to run the company as the Bryant Electric subsidiary of Westinghouse until 1927. One reason for downplaying the Westinghouse ownership was to keep Bryant distributors who had exclusive franchises to sell products of Westinghouse's competitors from dropping the Bryant line.

For a time, Bryant was Bridgeport's largest employer and, by 1912, its 200,000-square-foot (19,000 m^{2}) plant in Bridgeport's West End neighborhood was the largest in the world "devoted exclusively to the manufacture of wiring devices". As electrical components began to be made with plastic, Bryant acquired Hemco Plastics Company in 1928. By that year, Bryant was selling over 4,000 different products. By 1938, the plant had grown to 500,000 square feet (46,000 m^{2}) and employed 1,537 people, increased to 1,600 in 1946.

== Labor relations ==
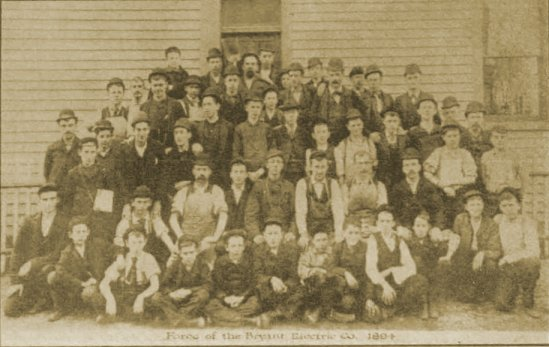
Bryant Electric workers - 1894

At the time of Bryant's founding and rapid growth Bridgeport's West End was a dense, congested working-class neighborhood and a large population of mostly Hungarian immigrants, as well as Swedes, Slovenians and French Canadians, lived to the south of the industrial zone where Bryant was located. Subsequently, a large number of Hungarians were employed by the company in its early days. In 1944, in an effort to maintain good relations with its Hungarian employees, Bryant transferred a strip of land to the Hungarian Reformed Church to be used for construction of a basketball court, gymnasium and auditorium.

Workers at the Bryant plant were involved in a number of notable strikes over the years, including a 1915 strike when a number of Bridgeport companies were closed down amid demands for union representation and an eight-hour day and a 1955 United Electrical Workers strike over working conditions and pay.

=== 1915 strike ===
While thousands took part in the Bridgeport strikes of 1915, few were actually union members and many were women who had been denied membership in craft unions. The Bryant Electric strike was started by five hundred women assemblers and a handful of men who walked off the job on August 20, marched downtown for a mass meeting at Eagle's Hall and elected a strike committee with equal representation for women. The company responded by shutting the plant and charging the strikers with "rioting." The remaining two thirds of the plant joined the strikers and after two weeks the company acceded to the workers' demands for an eight-hour day, overtime pay and union representation.

== Deindustrialization and plant closing ==
As part of a larger process of regional deindustrialization, Westinghouse shut down the Bryant Electric plant in 1988 after transferring most of the work to non-union plants in North Carolina, Puerto Rico and the Dominican Republic. The closing exacerbated the neighborhood's already bleak economic situation. Westinghouse sold its remaining interests in Bryant Electric to Hubbell Incorporated in 1991 with the rebranded Distribution and Controls Business Unit going to Eaton in 1994. Bryant's 20-building, 6-acre (24,000 m^{2}) site in Bridgeport's West End was torn down in 1996 to make way for a new industrial park.

== See also ==
- History of Bridgeport, Connecticut
- Manufacturing in the U.S.
