= Bertha Lamme Feicht =

20th-century American engineer

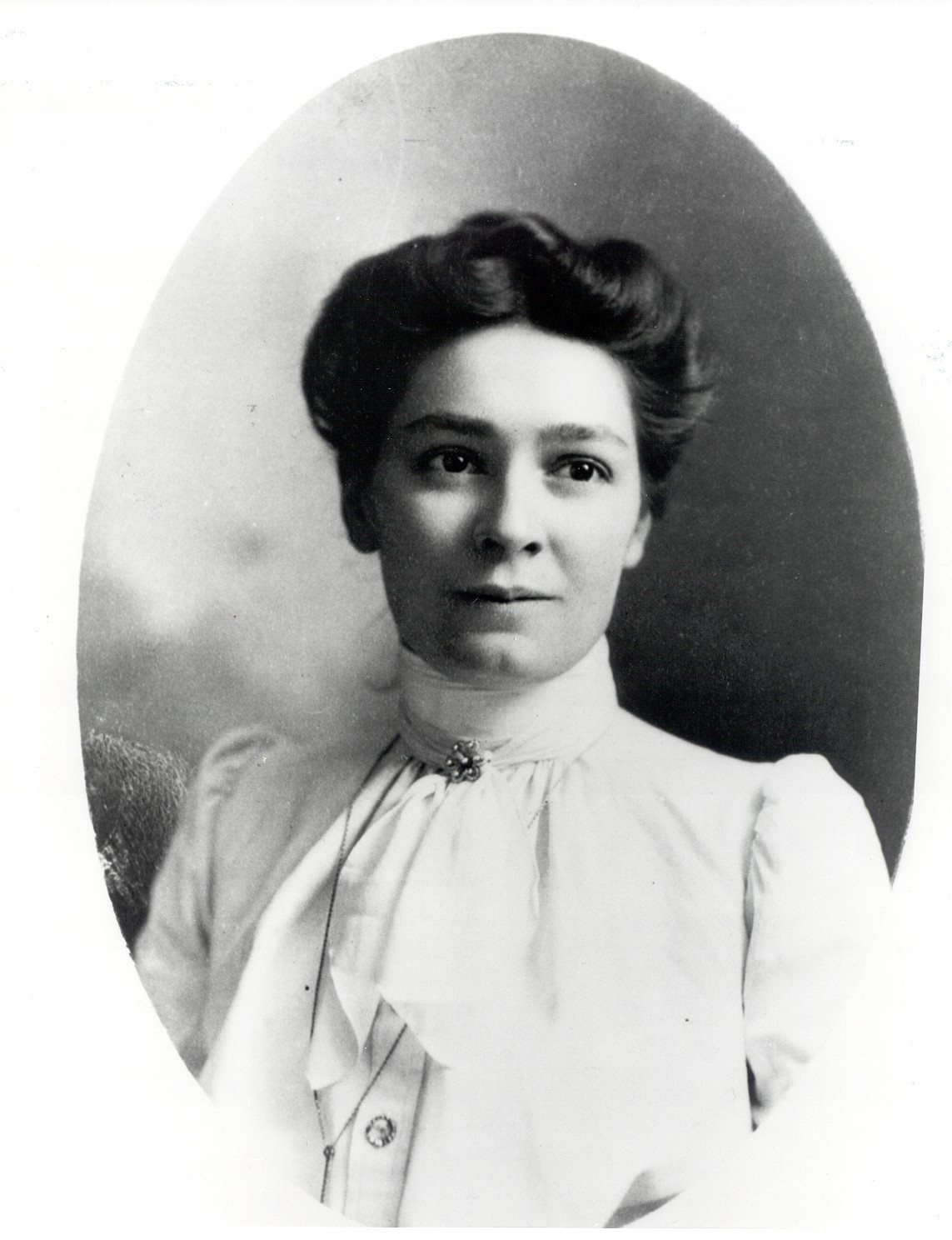
- Bertha Lamme Feicht in 1892
- Born: Bertha Lamme; December 16, 1869; Bethel Township, Ohio, U.S.
- Died: November 20, 1943 (aged 73); Pittsburgh, Pennsylvania, U.S.
- Education: Bachelor of Mechanical Engineering, Ohio State University
- Occupation: Electrical engineer
- Years active: 1893–1905
- Employer: Westinghouse
- Known for: First woman to receive a degree in engineering from Ohio State
- Spouse: Russell S. Feicht
- Children: Florence Feicht

Bertha Lamme Feicht (December 16, 1869 – November 20, 1943) was an American engineer. In 1893, she became the first woman to receive a degree in engineering from the Ohio State University. She is considered to be the first American woman to graduate in a main discipline of engineering other than civil engineering.

== Early life and education ==
She was born Bertha Lamme on her family's farm in Bethel Township near Springfield, Ohio on December 16, 1869.

After graduating from Olive Branch High School in 1889, she followed in her brother, Benjamin G. Lamme's footsteps and enrolled at Ohio State that fall.

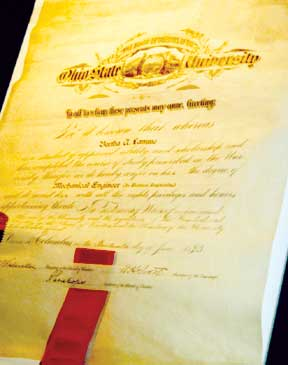
Bertha Lamme Feicht's diploma from Ohio State

She graduated in 1893 with a degree in mechanical engineering with a specialty in electricity. Her thesis was titled "An Analysis of Tests of a Westinghouse Railway Generator." The student newspaper reported that there was an outbreak of spontaneous applause when she received her degree.

== Career ==
She was then hired by Westinghouse as its first female engineer. She worked there until she married Russell S. Feicht, her supervisor and fellow Ohio State alumnus, on December 14, 1905.

== Personal life ==
She had one child, Florence, born in 1910, who became a physicist for the U.S. Bureau of Mines.

Bertha Lamme Feicht died in Pittsburgh on November 20, 1943 and was buried in Homewood Cemetery.

Her husband Russell died in April 1949.

== Legacy ==
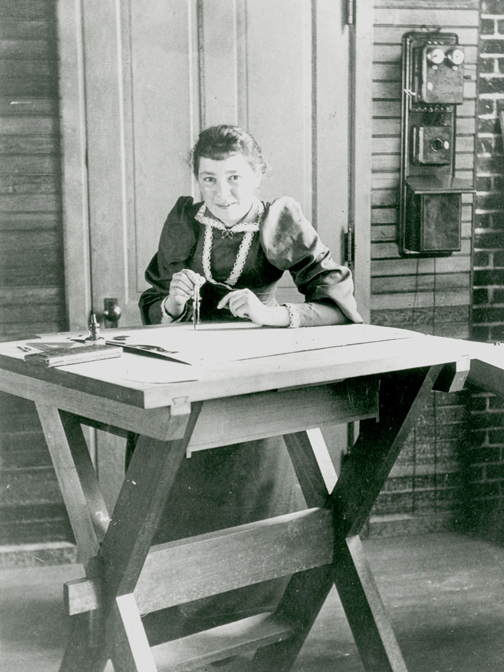
1892 Bertha Lamme at drawing table with compass

Some of her personal effects, including her slide rule, T-square, and diploma, are housed in the collections of the Heinz History Center in Pittsburgh.

The Westinghouse Educational Foundation, in conjunction with the Society of Women Engineers, created a scholarship named for her in 1973.
