= Schindler Elevator Corporation =

American elevator company

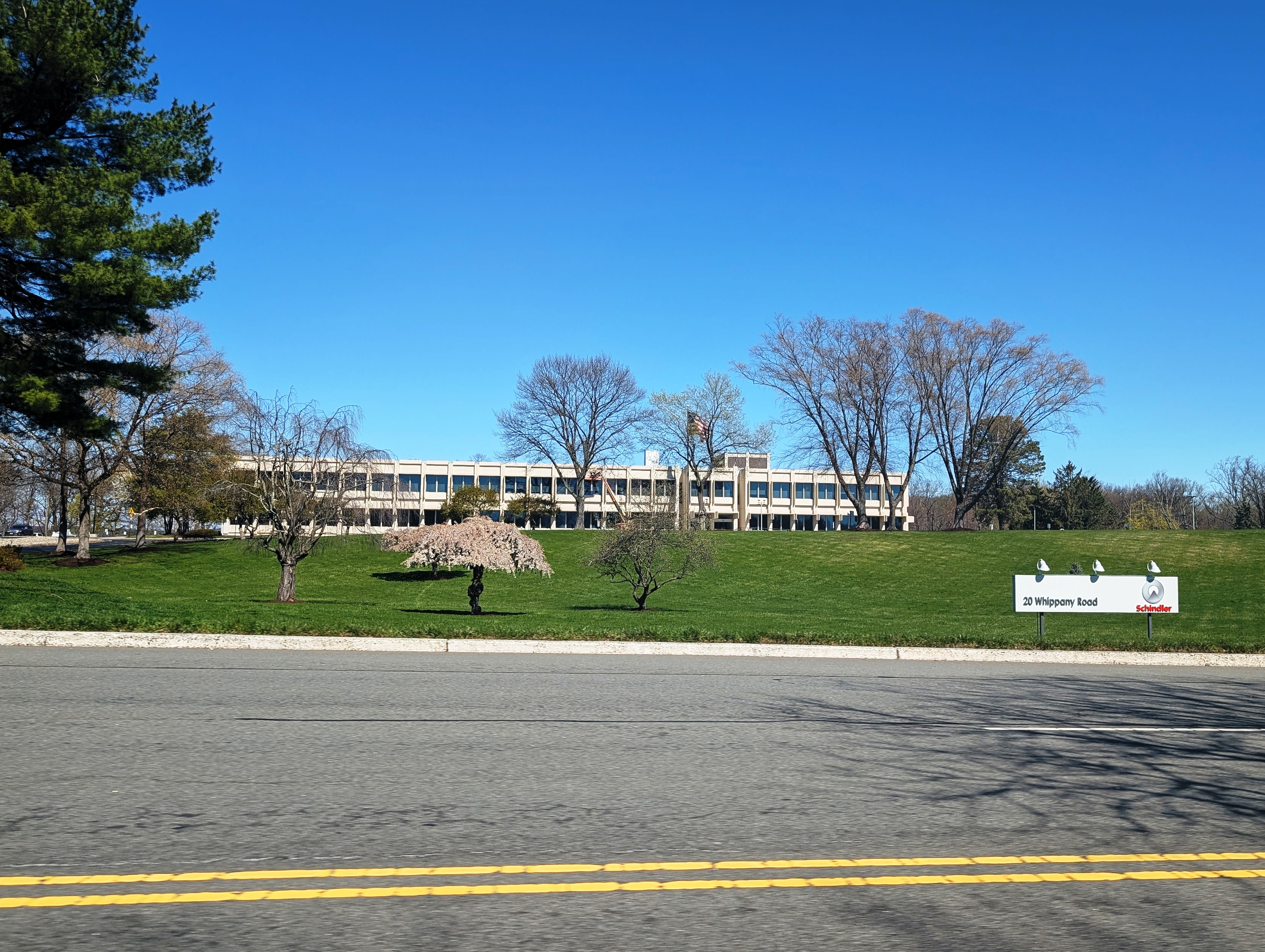
- Corporate headquarters
- Company type: Subsidiary
- Industry: Vertical transportation
- Predecessor: Haughton Elevator and Machine Company; Elevator division of Westinghouse Electric Corporation
- Founded: 1989; 37 years ago
- Headquarters: Morris Township, New Jersey, U.S.
- Number of locations: 1,000 (2015)
- Area served: United States; Canada
- Products: Elevators, Escalators
- Revenue: CHF 9,400,000,000 (US$9,800,000,000) (2015)
- Number of employees: 56,000 (February 2015)
- Parent: Schindler Group
- Website: www.schindler.com

Schindler Elevator Corporation is the North American division of Schindler Group, a Swiss multinational manufacturer of elevators and escalators. The division traces its origins back to 1869 with the establishment of the Haughton Elevator and Machine Company and 1928 with the founding of the Westinghouse Elevator Division. Schindler's U.S. headquarters are located outside of Morristown, New Jersey, and Canadian operations are based in Toronto, Ontario.

== History ==
=== Haughton ===
Nathaniel Haughton, a retired colonel in the U.S. Army, purchased an interest in the Toledo Steam Engine Works, a small manufacturing company in Toledo, Ohio, in 1867. The firm produced steam engines and other industrial equipment, and began manufacturing elevators in 1880, when Haughton purchased the remainder of the company. It was reorganized as the Haughton Elevator and Machine Company in 1897.

Schindler acquired Haughton in 1979, forming Schindler Haughton to enter the U.S. market. The company continued to produce Haughton elevators under the Schindler Haughton name until 1989, when Schindler acquired the elevator division of Westinghouse Electric Corporation.

=== Canadian operations ===
In 1982, Schindler (Canada) acquired Armor Elevator, to establish themselves in Canada with headquarters in Pickering, Ontario. Other acquisitions followed, including Abec of Montreal, Beckett’s service business, Universal in Ottawa and Western Elevator in 1985 renamed to Schindler Elevator Corporation 1989.

=== Acquisitions ===
- Hobson Elevator Company of Boise, Idaho (1998)
- Tri-State Elevator Company of Shreveport, Louisiana (1998)
- Hontz Elevator Company of Wallingford, Connecticut (2005)

== See also ==
- List of elevator manufacturers
