= Westinghouse Electric Corporation =

Major American manufacturing company (1886–1997)

- Logo designed by Paul Rand
- Formerly: Westinghouse Electric & Manufacturing Company (1886–1945); Westinghouse Electric Corp. (1945–1997); CBS Corporation (1997–2000)
- Type: Public company
- Traded as: NYSE: WX (1916–1997); DJIA component (until 1997); S&P 500 component (until 1997)
- Founded: August 8, 1886; 140 years ago
- Founder: George Westinghouse
- Defunct: November 30, 1997; 28 years ago; (restructured); April 15, 2000; 26 years ago; (merged with Viacom)
- Fate: Renamed CBS Corporation; merged with Viacom in 2000
- Successor: CBS Corporation (1997–2000); Westinghouse Electric Company (nuclear power division)
- Headquarters: Pittsburgh, Pennsylvania, U.S.
- Area served: Worldwide
- Divisions: New England Westinghouse (1915–1926); Westinghouse Broadcasting (1920–1999); Westinghouse Aviation (1945–1960)
- Subsidiaries: British Westinghouse (1899–1917); Bryant (1901–1927); Canadian Westinghouse (1903–1997); Infinity (1996–1997); CBS (1995–1997); CMT (1997); The Nashville Network (1997)
- Website: westinghouse.com/ paramount.com

The Westinghouse Electric Corporation was an American manufacturing company founded in 1886 by George Westinghouse and headquartered in Pittsburgh, Pennsylvania. It was originally named "Westinghouse Electric & Manufacturing Company" and was renamed "Westinghouse Electric Corporation" in 1945. Through the early and mid-20th century, Westinghouse Electric was a powerhouse in heavy industry, electrical production and distribution, consumer electronics, home appliances and a wide variety of other products. They were a major supplier of generators and steam turbines for most of their history, and were also a major player in the field of nuclear power, starting with the Westinghouse Atom Smasher in 1937.

A series of downturns and management missteps in the 1970s and 1980s combined with large cash balances led the company to enter the financial services business. Their focus was on mortgages, which suffered significant losses in the late 1980s. In 1992 they announced a major restructuring and the liquidation of their credit operations. In 1995, in a major change of direction, the company acquired the CBS television network and renamed itself CBS Corporation. Most of its remaining industrial businesses were sold off at this time. CBS Corp was acquired by Viacom in 1999, a merger completed in April 2000. The CBS Corporation name was later reused for one of the two companies resulting from the split of Viacom in 2005.

One of the few remaining original lines of business to survive this process was the nuclear power division, which was sold to BNFL in 1999 and re-formed as Westinghouse Electric Company.

Westinghouse Electric Corporation now owns the Westinghouse trademarks that were previously owned and licensed by Westinghouse Licensing Corporation, which was a subsidiary of ViacomCBS. As of 2026, Westinghouse Electric Corporation operates the website westinghouse.com/, and identifies itself as a producer of various products such as home and kitchen appliances, lighting products, televisions, electronics, HVAC systems, electric fireplaces, electric generators, nuclear power stations, pressure washers, and string trimmers.

== History ==
=== Beginnings ===
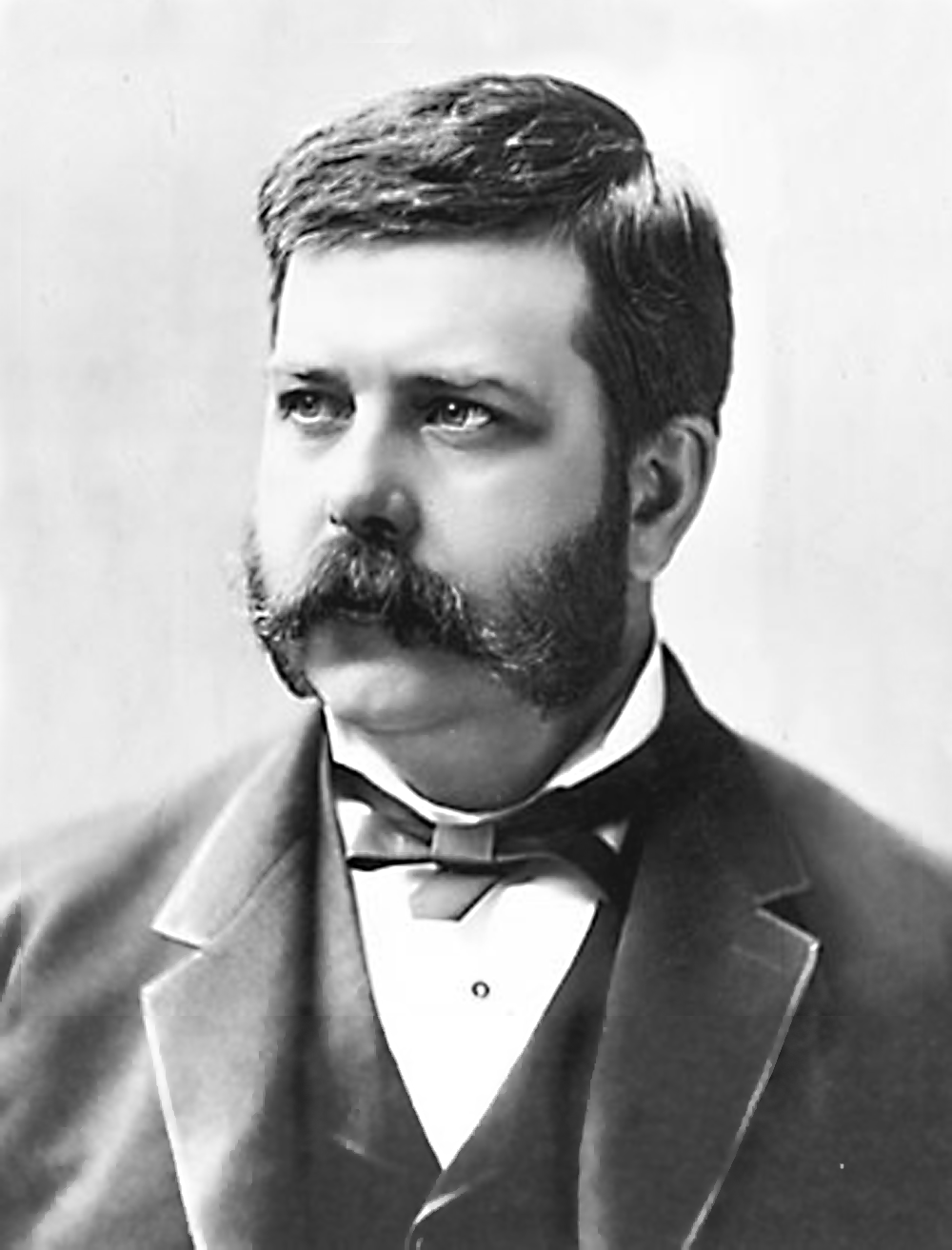
George Westinghouse, founder

Westinghouse Electric was founded by George Westinghouse in Pittsburgh, Pennsylvania, on January 8, 1886. Building on the advancement of AC technology in Europe, the firm became active in developing alternating current (AC) electric infrastructure throughout the United States. The company's largest factories were located in East Pittsburgh, Pennsylvania, Lester, Pennsylvania and Hamilton, Ontario, where they made turbines, generators, motors, and switch gear for the generation, transmission, and use of electricity. In addition to George Westinghouse, early engineers working for the company included Frank Conrad, Benjamin Garver Lamme, Bertha Lamme (first woman mechanical engineer in the United States), Oliver B. Shallenberger, William Stanley, Nikola Tesla, Stephen Timoshenko, and Vladimir Zworykin.

Early on, Westinghouse was a rival to Thomas Edison's electric company. In 1892, Edison was merged with Westinghouse's chief AC rival, the Thomson-Houston Electric Company, making an even bigger competitor, General Electric.

During the 20th century, Westinghouse engineers and scientists were granted more than 28,000 U.S. patents, the third most of any company. Westinghouse Electric & Manufacturing Company changed its name to Westinghouse Electric Corporation in 1945.

=== 1990s ===
In 1990, Westinghouse experienced a serious setback when the corporation lost over one billion dollars due to bad high-risk, high-fee, high-interest loans made by its Westinghouse Credit Corporation lending arm.

In an attempt to revitalize the corporation, the board of directors appointed outside management in the form of CEO Michael H. Jordan, who brought in numerous consultants to help re-engineer the company to realize the potential that they saw in the broadcasting industry. Westinghouse reduced the workforce in many of its traditional industrial operations and made further acquisitions in broadcasting to add to its already substantial Group W network, including Infinity Broadcasting, TNN, CMT, American Radio Systems, and rights to NFL broadcasting. These investments cost the company over fifteen billion dollars. To recoup its costs, Westinghouse sold many other operations, including its defense electronics division, its metering and load control division (which was sold to ABB), its residential security division, the office furniture company Knoll, and Thermo King.

Westinghouse purchased CBS Inc. in 1994 for $5.4 billion. Westinghouse Electric Corporation changed its name to and became the original CBS Corporation in 1997. Also in 1997, the Power Generation Business Unit, headquartered in Orlando, Florida, was sold to Siemens of Germany. A year later, CBS sold all of its commercial nuclear power businesses to British Nuclear Fuels Limited (BNFL). In connection with that sale, certain rights to use the Westinghouse trademarks were granted to the newly formed BNFL subsidiary, Westinghouse Electric Company. That company was sold to Toshiba in 2006.

== Products and sponsorships ==
- Power generation: The company pioneered the power generation industry and in the fields of long-distance power transmission and high-voltage alternating-current transmission, unveiling the technology for lighting in Great Barrington, Massachusetts.
- Steam turbine generator: The first commercial Westinghouse steam turbine-driven generator, a 1,500 kW unit, began operation at Hartford Electric Light Co. in 1901. The machine, nicknamed Mary-Ann, was the first steam turbine generator to be installed by an electric utility to generate electricity in the US. George Westinghouse had based his original steam turbine design on designs licensed from the English inventor Charles Parsons. Today a large proportion of steam turbine generators operating around the world, ranging to units as large as 1,500 MW (or 1,000 times the original 1901 unit) were supplied by Westinghouse from its factories in Lester, Pennsylvania, Charlotte, North Carolina, or Hamilton, Ont. or were built overseas under Westinghouse license. Major Westinghouse licensees or joint venture partners included Mitsubishi Heavy Industries of Japan and Harbin Turbine Co. and Shanghai Electric Co. of China.
- Research: Westinghouse had 50,000 employees by 1900 and established a formal research and development department in 1906. While the company was expanding, it would experience internal financial difficulties. During the Panic of 1907, the board of directors forced George Westinghouse to take a six-month leave of absence. Westinghouse officially retired in 1909 and died several years later in 1914.
- Electrical technology: Under new leadership, Westinghouse Electric diversified its business activities in electrical technology. It acquired the Copeman Electric Stove Company in 1914 and Pittsburgh High Voltage Insulator Company in 1921. Westinghouse also moved into radio broadcasting by establishing Pittsburgh's KDKA, the first commercial radio station, and WBZ in Springfield, Massachusetts in 1921. Westinghouse expanded into the elevator business, establishing the Westinghouse Elevator Company in 1928; it sold its elevator business to Schindler Group (forming the Schindler Elevator Corporation) in 1989. Throughout the decade, diversification engendered considerable growth; sales went from $43 million in 1914 to $216 million in 1929.
- Aviation: Westinghouse produced the first operational American turbojet for the US Navy program in 1943. After many successes, the ill-fated J40 project, started soon after World War Two, was abandoned in 1955 and led to Westinghouse exiting the aircraft engine business with the closure of the Westinghouse Aviation Gas Turbine Division (Kansas City) in 1960.
- Gas turbines: During the late 1940s, Westinghouse applied its aviation gas turbine technology and experience to develop its first industrial gas turbine. A 2,000–horsepower model W21 was installed in 1948 at the Mississippi River Fuel Corp gas compression station in Wilmar, Arkansas. This was the starting point for the company to enter in industrial and utility gas turbine business, prior to the sale by Westinghouse of the power generation business to Siemens AG in 1997. Evolving from the Small Steam and Gas Turbine Division formed in the early 1950s, the Westinghouse Combustion Turbine Systems Division was located in Concordville, Pennsylvania, near Philadelphia and the old Lester, Pennsylvania plant, until it was relocated to Power Generation headquarters in Orlando, Florida in 1987.
- Nuclear power: As a result of its participation in the US government's military program for nuclear energy applications (e.g., The Nuclear Navy) Westinghouse used that experience in the development and commercialization of nuclear energy systems for electric power generation. This business currently operates as the Westinghouse Electric Company and is owned by Brookfield Business Partners of Canada. Electricite de France (EDF) a major global player in the nuclear power business, was a long-time licensee of the Westinghouse nuclear technology.
- Industrial motors: Additional major industrial products in the widespread Westinghouse portfolio included electric motors of all sizes, elevators and escalators, controls, and lighting. The Large Motor Division, once headquartered in Buffalo, NY, entered a joint venture with Taiwan Electric Co. (TECO) in the 1970s and today operates as TECO-Westinghouse. Much of Westinghouse's higher voltage power equipment was sold to ABB in 1989 and renamed the ABB Power T&D Company.
- Rail transit: The Westinghouse Transportation Division (est. 1894) supplied equipment and controls for many North American interurban and streetcar lines, the San Francisco Bay Area Rapid Transit, Washington Metro, New York City Subway equipment from the 1890s elevated era to the R68A in 1988, among many other heavy rail and rail transit systems and built locomotives, often in partnership with Baldwin, Lima-Hamilton as well as supplying electrical and traction equipment for Fairbanks-Morse diesel locomotives. The division designed and built Automated People Movers (APMs) at several major U.S. airports, including Sea-Tac. Tampa, Dallas-Ft. Worth and Orlando. The Transportation Division was sold to AEG of Germany (1988), which merged into a joint venture of ABB and Daimler-Benz named AdTranz in 1996. Ultimately, the unit was acquired by Bombardier of Canada in 2001 and is still headquartered in Pittsburgh.
- Consumer electrics: Westinghouse was also among the initial manufacturers to make household electrical products including radios, televisions, and other audio/video equipment. This also included both small and large electric appliances of all kinds, from hair dryers and electric irons to clothes washers and dryers, refrigerators and air conditioning units. After more than 50 years, and after playing a strong No. 2 to rival General Electric for most of that time, Westinghouse decided to exit the appliance business in the mid-1970s. White-Westinghouse was formed when White Consolidated Industries acquired the Westinghouse appliance unit in 1975.
- World's Fair time capsules: The company is also known for its time capsule contributions during the 1939 New York World's Fair and 1964 New York World's Fair. They also participated in the St. Louis World's Fair in 1904. They sponsored the Westinghouse Auditorium at the fair, where they showed films documenting Westinghouse products and company plants. Westinghouse was one of the original corporate sponsors and exhibitors at Walt Disney World's EPCOT attraction in Orlando, Florida.

== Environmental incidents ==
There have been a number of Westinghouse-related environmental incidents in the US. Below is a short list of these. All of these are chemical pollution incidents; none of them involve nuclear reactors or nuclear pollution.

- Sharon plant: The Westinghouse Sharon Plant was a 58-acre Westinghouse transformer production facility in Mercer County, Pennsylvania. The EPA's recent Five Year Review Report (2016) of this Superfund site determined that the Shenango River has been polluted due to Westinghouse operations in this area. Because of the findings, the state of Pennsylvania has issued a "Do Not Eat" advisory for fish around the Westinghouse site. This plant was no longer operational after 1984. Westinghouse submitted their final cleanup plan in 1998, and further action beyond their dissolution has been liable to CBS. The transformer business unit was sold to ABB in 1989. This site now houses a product design company.
- Adams County plant: Westinghouse was fined $5.5 million in 1996 for polluting groundwater in over 100 wells, as well as other water sources, while operating its Westinghouse Elevator Company plant in Adams County, Pennsylvania. Degreasers and other toxic chemicals were released over a five-year period in the 1980s. This business unit was sold to Schindler in 1988. Future liability for cleanup has been directed to CBS following the dissolution of Westinghouse Electric Corporation in 1999.
- Horseheads site: Westinghouse operated a cathode-ray tube plant in Horseheads, New York. They were deemed responsible for pollution at the Kentucky Avenue Wellfield Superfund site in Horseheads, New York. Westinghouse polluted nearby soil, affecting the safety of a nearby aquifer and wells used by residents. One phase of the cleanup effort describes Westinghouse Electric Corporation's facility, designated "Disposal Area F" and the "Former Runoff Basin Area", which are contaminated with volatile organic compounds (VOCs), polycyclic aromatic hydrocarbons (PAHs) and arsenic, will be cleaned up using a combination of soil excavation and soil vapor extraction. At Disposal Area F, the area of contamination is about 0.3 acres. At the Former Runoff Basin Area, the contaminated soils cover approximately 0.7 acres. Disposal of the excavated soils occurred at appropriate off-site facilities. The removal of the PAHs and arsenic contamination will protect site workers and employees at the Westinghouse facility and the cleanup of the VOCs will help restore the quality of the Newtown Creek Aquifer. In 1986, Westinghouse entered a joint venture at this plant with Toshiba to produce Cathode-Ray Tubes (CRTs). In 1989, Toshiba became part owner of this plant and the Westinghouse CRT business unit. Future liability has been shifted to CBS.
- Sunnyvale plant: Westinghouse operated a plant which manufactured electronics for military systems in Sunnyvale, California. Groundwater and soil near this plant are contaminated with PCBs, fuels, and volatile organic compounds (VOCs). Potential health threats to area residents include accidentally ingesting or coming into direct contact with site contaminants in soil or groundwater. There are municipal drinking water wells within 1/4-mile from this site, and 300,000 people get their drinking water from within three miles of the site. This business unit was sold to Northrop Grumman in 1996. Future liability for this action has been passed on to CBS.

== Timeline of company evolution ==
=== 1880s ===
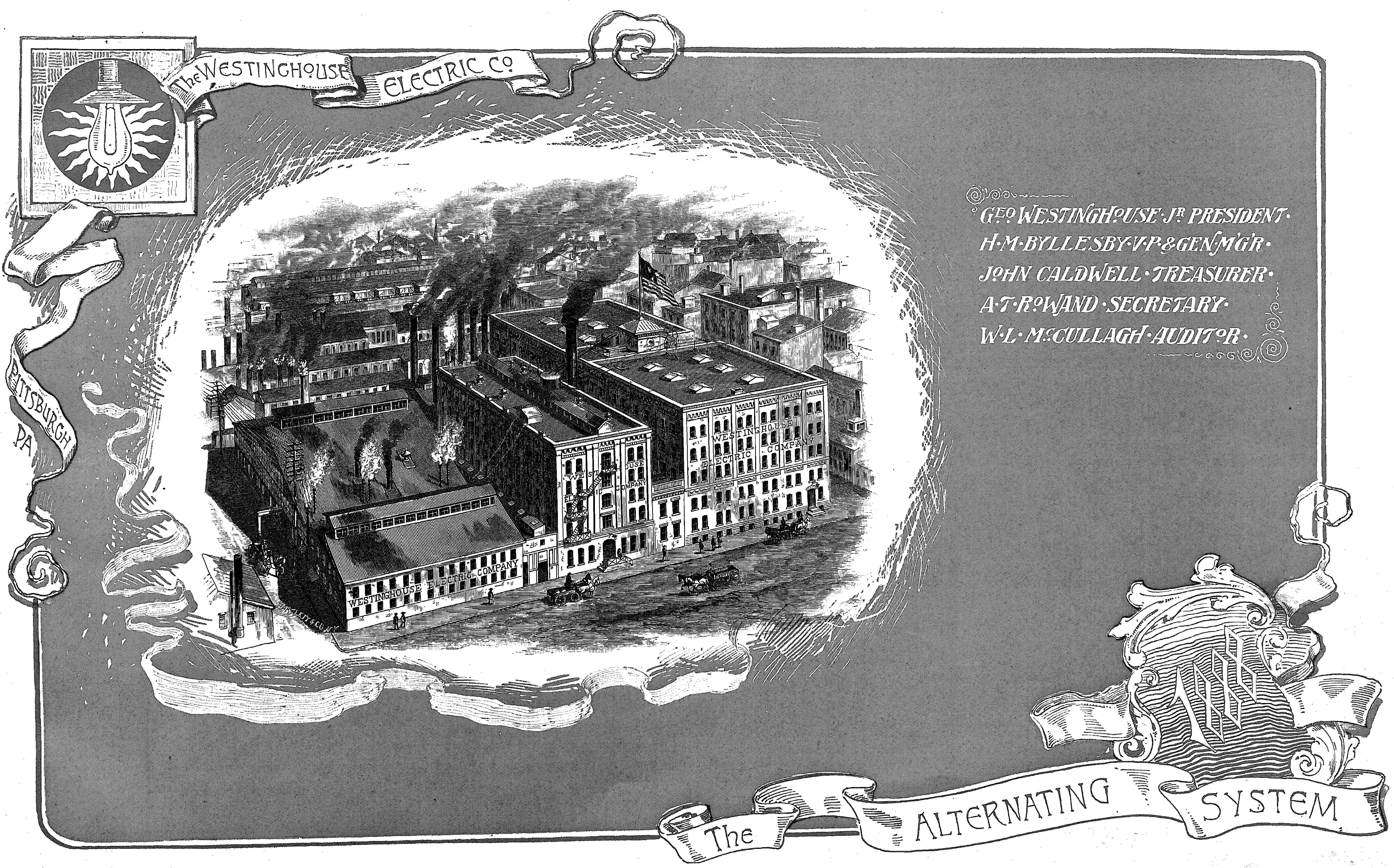
1888 Westinghouse brochure advertising their Alternating system

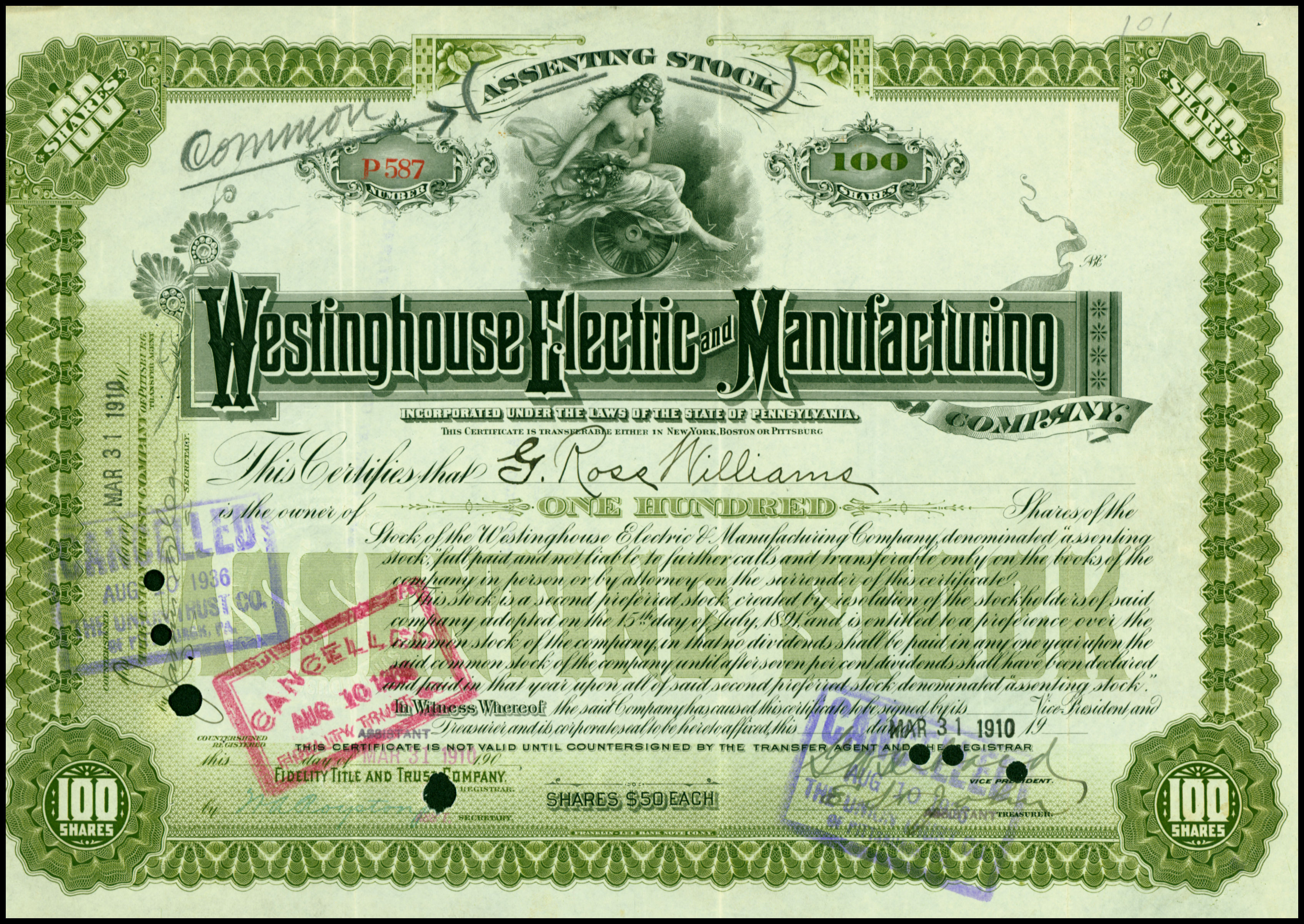
Share of the Westinghouse Electric and Manufacturing Company, issued March 31, 1910

- 1884 – George Westinghouse begins developing a DC electric lighting system
- 1885 – Westinghouse becomes aware of the new European transformer based alternating current systems when he reads about them in the UK technical journal Engineering
- 1885 – William Stanley, Jr., working for Westinghouse, develops the first practical AC transformer
- 1886 – Westinghouse Electric Company founded in East Pittsburgh
- 1886 – William Stanley, Jr. installs the world's first operational transformer based multiple voltage transmission system, a demonstration lighting system in Great Barrington, Massachusetts
- 1888 – development of an induction ampere-hour meter for alternating current developed by Oliver B. Shallenberger
- 1888 – licensing of Nikola Tesla's AC and Induction motor patents (Tesla was hired for one year as a consultant, but he quit after a few months)
- 1889 – renames itself the Westinghouse Electric & Manufacturing Company

=== 1890s ===
- 1891 – built world's first industrial AC system (Ames Hydroelectric Generating Plant)
- 1893 – supplied electric lights and power for World's Columbian Exposition and generators for Gettysburg Electric Railway
- 1893 – hired Bertha Lamme Feicht, the company's first female engineer
- 1894 – transportation Division (rail equipment) founded
- 1895 – installed hydropower AC generators at Adams Power Plant, Niagara Falls which supplied power to Buffalo, New York, completed 1896
- 1898 – purchases Walker Mfg. Co of Cleveland, establishing main facility and plant in Cleveland which produces power-transmitting machinery, cable railway networks, castings and lighting
- 1899 – founded British Westinghouse Electric and Manufacturing Company

=== 1900s to 1920s ===
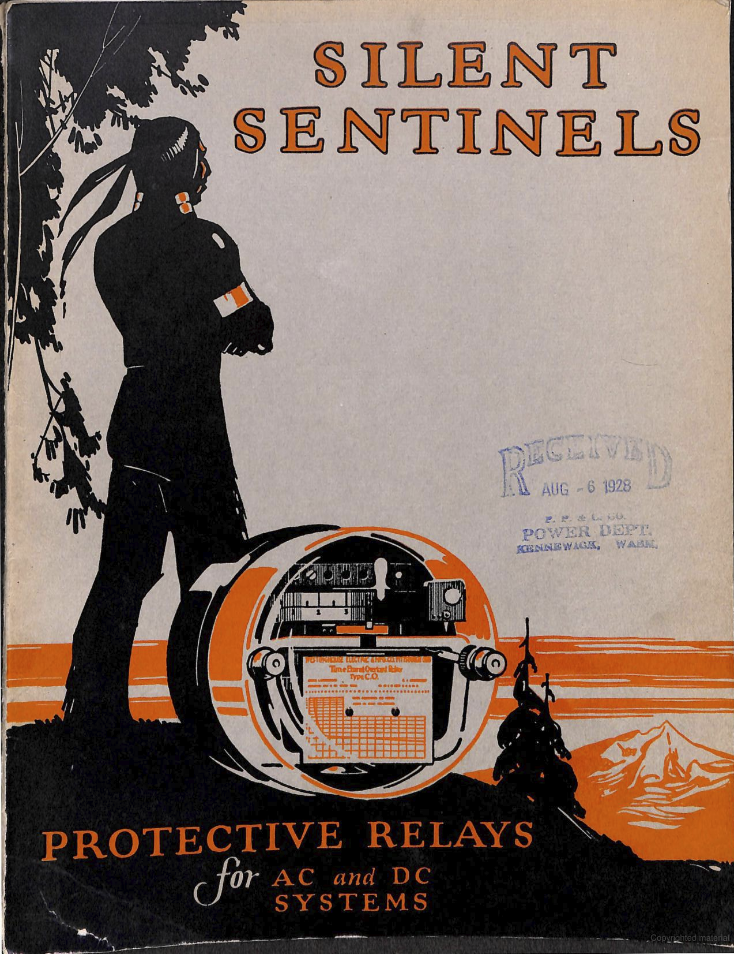
1924 book on protective relays for AC and DC electrical systems by the company

- 1901 – acquires Bryant Electric Company of Bridgeport, Connecticut, which continues operation as a subsidiary
- 1901 – operation of first Westinghouse steam turbine generator installed at Hartford Electric Light Co.
- 1904 – with Baldwin, markets Baldwin-Westinghouse electric locomotives and AC electrification of railroads, particularly to the New Haven Railroad
- 1909 – introduces continuous-filament tungsten light bulb; ousts George Westinghouse as chairman during bankruptcy reorganization
- 1914 – acquires Copeman Electric Stove Company in Flint, Michigan from Lloyd Groff Copeman, moves it to Mansfield, Ohio and enters the home appliance market (sold in 1974 to White Consolidated Industries)
- 1914 – George Westinghouse dies, with a legacy including 361 patents and the founding of 60 companies
- 1915 – New England Westinghouse Company opens for business, first product is Mosin–Nagant rifles for the Russian Czar's army; within two years, the Bolsheviks cancel a previous order of over 1 million rifles after overthrowing the Russian Provisional Government, and facing bankruptcy, Westinghouse is rescued by the American Government when it purchases the rifles for use by the military
- 1917 – share of British Westinghouse purchased by a British holding company, which becomes Metropolitan-Vickers
- 1917 – builds steam turbine manufacturing plant in Lester, PA (Tinicum Township) near the Philadelphia airport
- 1919 – 8XE Pittsburgh experimental station goes on the air
- 1919 – creates RCA with GE, AT&T and United Fruit, buys the American division of Marconi
- 1920 – acquires International Radio Telegraph Company (formerly known as the National Electric Signaling Company)
- 1921 – acquires the Pittsburg High Voltage Insulator Company
- 1920s – enters the broadcasting industry, with stations like KDKA in Pittsburgh, Pennsylvania and WBZ in Springfield, Massachusetts, later moving to Boston.
- 1926 – in partnership with GE and RCA founds NBC Broadcasting

=== 1930s and 1940s ===
- 1932 – announces Ignitron mercury-arc rectifier
- 1934 – opens its Home of Tomorrow in Mansfield, Ohio, to demonstrate Westinghouse home appliances
- 1935 – completes longest continuous electric steel annealing furnace in the world at Ford Motor Company, Dearborn, Michigan
- 1930s – funds invention of the magnetohydrodynamic generator
- 1937 – builds first "industrial atom smasher", a 5 MeV Van de Graaff electrostatic nuclear accelerator
- 1940s – enters aviation with airborne radar (defense electronics sold 1996), jet engine propulsion, and ground-based airport lighting, gets defense contract from U.S. military to produce plastic helmet liners for the M1 Helmet
- 1941 – after years of resistance to the unionization efforts of its employees and to the National Labor Relations Act, signs a national labor agreement with the United Electrical, Radio and Machine Workers of America after a United States Supreme Court decision that upheld the Act
- 1943 – purchased the lamp division of Kentucky-Radio Corporation (Ken-Rad) in Owensboro, Kentucky from Roy Burlew in exchange for 35,000 shares of Westinghouse stock valued at $1.6 million ($29.8 million today^{when?})
- 1945 – renames itself the Westinghouse Electric Corporation and makes first automatic elevator
- 1945 – Westinghouse Aviation Gas Turbine Division (AGT) started
- 1948 – "You Can Be Sure... If It's Westinghouse" in Time magazine ad

=== 1950s to 1970s ===
- 1951 – conducts first live network TV in U.S.
- 1952 – opens Cathode Ray Tube facility in Horseheads, New York; facility housed three divisions: Cathode Ray Tube, Electronic Tube, and Industrial and Government Tube
- 1954 – enters finance as Westinghouse Credit Corporation
- 1955 – buys KDKA-TV (then WDTV) in Pittsburgh and KYW-TV (then WNBK, now WKYC) and KYW Radio (originally, and currently WTAM) along with KYW-FM (then WTAM-FM, currently WMJI) in Cleveland; KYW is now licensed to a TV and AM radio station in Philadelphia
- 1955 – Westinghouse J40 engine failure causes all F3H fighters using the engine to be grounded, and all other jets using it switch to other engines; Westinghouse is forced out of aircraft engine business
- 1957 – introduces first successful "cobra head" roadway luminaire, the OV-25, integrating both ballast and optics in a more streamlined modern design
- 1961 – acquires Thermo King (sold in 1997 to Ingersoll Rand)
- 1964 – begins Skybus project; beginning of automated mass transit
- 1965 – invention of the first MEMS device, buys Marketeer Electronic Vehicles
- 1966 – founds Cinema Center Films
- 1966 – starts housing and real estate development divisions
- 1966 – buys a toy manufacturer
- 1967 – lights America's first computer-controlled outdoor electric sign
- 1967 – makes the lowest bid for the BART project
- 1969 – buys 7 Up bottling
- 1973 – develops world's first AMLCD displays
- 1974 – sells well-known home appliance division to White Consolidated Industries, which becomes White-Westinghouse
- 1979 – withdraws from all oil related projects in the Middle East after Iranian Revolution

=== 1980s ===
- 1981 – acquires both cable television operator TelePrompter (sold 1985), Muzak (sold September 1986), and 50% of Showtime for $576 million
- 1982 – acquires robot maker Unimation
- 1982 – sells street light division to Cooper Lighting
- 1983 – sells electric lamp division to Philips
- 1984 – buys Unimation robotics for $105 million
- 1986 – buys Los Angeles TV station
- 1986 – enters into joint venture with Airship Industries, Ltd. (London) to develop advanced lighter-than-air radar platforms and early warning surveillance airship for U.S. Navy in cooperation with its subsidiary TCOM Corp. located on the former Naval Air Station Weeksville in Elizabeth City, North Carolina
- 1987 – buys radio stations in Sacramento and Chicago
- 1987 – buys electrical equipment, engineering and waste disposal divisions
- 1988 – sells elevator/escalator division to Schindler Group, now known as Schindler Elevator Corporation
- 1988 – enters into joint venture with Taiwan Electric to build electric motors; Taiwan Electric eventually becomes sole owner of business as TECO Motor Company
- 1988 – spins Industrial and Government Tube Division off as Imaging and Sensing Technologies Corporation
- 1988 – closes the East Pittsburgh generator and Lester, PA turbine plants, which had once been the primary Westinghouse manufacturing facilities
- 1988 – Bryant Electric subsidiary closed, assets sold to Hubbell in 1991
- 1988 – Transportation Division, including railroad (locomotive and mass transit) equipment business sold to AEG, later merged into Adtranz in 1996, Bombardier Transportation in 2001, and Alstom in 2021
- 1989 – sells transmission and distribution business (including their watthour meter business) to ASEA Brown Boveri Group (ABB)
- 1989 – buys Shaw-Walker Furniture and Reff Furniture
- 1989 – buys Legacy Broadcasting

=== 1990s to 2020s ===
- 1990 – buys Knoll International Furniture
- 1994 – buys United Technologies' Norden electronic systems
- 1994 – Cleveland operations and facilities purchased by Eaton Corporation for $1.6 billion; Cleveland Westinghouse facilities, as well as manufacturing plants converted into other commercial enterprises
- 1994–95 – separates IT and phone service sales into Westinghouse Communications division
- 1995 – under the leadership of Michael H. Jordan buys CBS for $5.4 billion ($11.4 billion today)
- 1996 – buys Infinity Broadcasting for $4.7 billion
- 1996 – sells Westinghouse Electronic Systems defense business to Northrop Grumman for $3 billion ($6.2 billion today), becoming Northrop Grumman Electronic Systems
- 1997 – sells Thermo King division to Ingersoll Rand
- 1997 – buys American Radio Systems for $2.6 billion, increasing station network to 175

Logo used by original CBS Corp

- 1997 – sells most non-broadcast operations; renames itself CBS Corporation as of December 1
- 1997 – sells its non-nuclear power generation and energy units to Siemens, which operated under the name Siemens Westinghouse until 2003
- 1998 – CBS Corporation creates Westinghouse Licensing Corporation subsidiary to manage the Westinghouse brand
- 1999 – sells remaining manufacturing asset, its nuclear energy business, to BNFL
- 1999 – buys Outdoor Systems for $8.7 billion and King World Productions for $2.5 billion
- 2000 – CBS acquired by Viacom
- 2005 – Viacom is split into two companies in January, with a new Viacom being spun off of the old Viacom company, and the old Viacom being renamed as CBS Corporation, thus reviving Westinghouse's last name prior to sale, and reversing the 2000 Viacom-CBS merger
- 2019 – Viacom and CBS Corporation remerge to form Paramount Global (known as ViacomCBS until 2022)
- 2021 – Westinghouse Electric Corporation acquires the Westinghouse trademarks from ViacomCBS
- 2025 – Paramount Global and majority owner National Amusements merged with Skydance Media to form Paramount Skydance Corporation

== Employees ==
=== CEOs ===
- George Westinghouse, 1886–1909
- Edwin Herr, 1911–1929
- Frank Anderson Merrick, 1929 – February 1938
- George Bucher, February 1938 – 1946
- Gwilym Price, 1946–1957
- Mark Cresap, Jr. 1957–1963
- Don Burnham, 1963–1975
- Robert Kirby, 1975–1983
- Douglas Danforth, December 1983 – December 1987
- John Marous, 1988 – June 29, 1990
- Paul Lego, June 30, 1990 – January 1993
- Gary Clark, January–July 1993
- Michael Jordan, July 1993 – 1997

=== Other ===
- Guy Tripp, a former Thomson-Houston employee who joined Westinghouse and became chairman of its board of directors in 1912, and served until his death in 1927.
- Vladimir K. Zworykin, employed 1918-1930

== Overseas subsidiaries ==
Westinghouse established subsidiary companies in several countries including British Westinghouse and Società Italiana Westinghouse in Vado Ligure, Italy. British Westinghouse became a subsidiary of Metropolitan-Vickers in 1919 and the Italian Westinghouse factory was taken over by Tecnomasio in 1921.

== See also ==
- List of Westinghouse locomotives
- Siemens Westinghouse, also known as Siemens Power Generation, Inc.
- War of the currents
- Westinghouse Electric Company
- Westinghouse Works, 1904
- Westinghouse Broadcasting, also known as Group W
- Westinghouse Lamp Plant
- Westinghouse Combustion Turbine Systems Division
- Westinghouse Aviation Gas Turbine Division
- White-Westinghouse
- Paramount Skydance
  - Paramount Global
- Westinghouse Licensing Corporation
- Schindler Elevator Corporation
