= Traction control system =

Function of the electronic stability control on production motor vehicles

A traction control system (TCS), is typically (but not necessarily) a secondary function of the electronic stability control (ESC) on production motor vehicles, designed to prevent loss of traction (i.e., wheelspin) of the driven road wheels. TCS is activated when throttle input, engine power and torque transfer are mismatched to the road surface conditions.

The intervention consists of one or more of the following:

- Brake force applied to one or more wheels
- Reduction or suppression of spark sequence to one or more cylinders
- Reduction of fuel supply to one or more cylinders
- Closing the throttle, if the vehicle is fitted with drive by wire throttle
- In turbocharged vehicles, a boost control solenoid is actuated to reduce boost and therefore engine power.

Typically, traction control systems share the electrohydraulic brake actuator (which does not use the conventional master cylinder and servo) and wheel-speed sensors with ABS.

The basic idea behind the need for a traction control system is the loss of road grip can compromise steering control and stability of vehicles. This is the result of the difference in traction of the drive wheels. The difference in slip may occur due to the turning of a vehicle or varying road conditions for different wheels. When a car turns, its outer and inner wheels rotate at different speeds; this is conventionally controlled by using a differential. A further enhancement of the differential is to employ an active differential that can vary the amount of power being delivered to outer and inner wheels as needed. For example, if outward slip is sensed while turning, the active differential may deliver more power to the outer wheel in order to minimize the yaw (essentially the degree to which the front and rear wheels of a car are out of line.) Active differential, in turn, is controlled by an assembly of electromechanical sensors collaborating with a traction control unit.

== History ==
The predecessor of modern electronic traction control systems can be found in high-torque, high-power rear-wheel-drive cars as a limited-slip differential. A limited-slip differential is a purely mechanical system that transfers a relatively small amount of power to the non-slipping wheel, while still allowing some wheel spin to occur.

In 1971, Buick introduced MaxTrac, which used an early computer system to detect rear wheel spin and modulate engine power to those wheels to provide the most traction. A Buick exclusive item at the time, it was an option on all full-size models, including the Riviera, Estate Wagon, Electra 225, Centurion, and LeSabre.

Cadillac introduced the Traction Monitoring System (TMS) in 1979 on the redesigned Eldorado.

== Operation ==
When the traction control computer (often incorporated into another control unit, such as the ABS module) detects one or more driven wheels spinning significantly faster than another, it invokes the ABS electronic control unit to apply brake friction to wheels spinning with lessened traction. Braking action on slipping wheel(s) will cause power transfer to wheel axle(s) with traction due to the mechanical action within the differential. All-wheel-drive (AWD) vehicles often have an electronically controlled coupling system in the transfer case or transaxle engaged (active part-time AWD), or locked-up tighter (in a true full-time set up driving all wheels with some power all the time) to supply non-slipping wheels with torque.

This often occurs in conjunction with the powertrain computer reducing available engine torque by electronically limiting throttle application and/or fuel delivery, retarding ignition spark, completely shutting down engine cylinders, and a number of other methods, depending on the vehicle and how much technology is used to control the engine and transmission. There are instances when traction control is undesirable, such as trying to get a vehicle unstuck in snow or mud. Allowing one wheel to spin can propel a vehicle forward enough to get it unstuck, whereas both wheels applying a limited amount of power will not produce the same effect. Many vehicles have a traction control shut-off switch for such circumstances.

== Components of traction control ==
Generally, the main hardware for traction control and ABS are mostly the same. In many vehicles, traction control is provided as an additional option for ABS.

- Each wheel is equipped with a sensor that senses changes in its speed due to loss of traction.
- The sensed speed from the individual wheels is passed on to an electronic control unit (ECU).
- The ECU processes the information from the wheels and initiates braking to the affected wheels via a cable connected to an automatic traction control (ATC) valve.

In all vehicles, traction control is automatically started when the sensors detect loss of traction at any of the wheels.

== Use of traction control ==
- In road cars: Traction control has traditionally been a safety feature in premium high-performance cars, which otherwise need sensitive throttle input to prevent spinning driven wheels when accelerating, especially in wet, icy, or snowy conditions. In recent years, traction control systems have become widely available in non-performance cars, minivans, and light trucks and in some small hatchbacks.
- In race cars: Traction control is used as a performance enhancement, allowing maximum traction under acceleration without wheel spin. When accelerating out of a turn, it keeps the tires at optimal slip ratio.
- In heavy trucks: Traction control is available as well. Here the pneumatic brake system needs some additional valves and control logic to realize a TCS (or sometimes called ASR) system.
- In motorcycles: Traction control for production motorcycles was first available with the BMW K1 in 1988. Honda offered Traction Control as an option, along with ABS, on their ST1100 beginning about 1992. By 2009, traction control was an option for several models offered by BMW and Ducati, the model year 2010 Kawasaki Concours 14 (1400GTR) and Honda CBR 650R in the year 2019, and Triumph "Modern Classic" line of motorcycles.
- In off-road vehicles: Traction control is used instead of or in addition to, the mechanical limited-slip or locking differential. It is often implemented with an electronic limited-slip differential, as well as other computerized controls of the engine and transmission. The spinning wheel is slowed with short applications of brakes, diverting more torque to the non-spinning wheel; this is the system adopted by Range Rover in 1993, for example. ABS brake-traction control has several advantages over limited-slip and locking differentials, such as steering control of a vehicle is easier, so the system can be continuously enabled. It also creates less stress on powertrain and driveline components, and increases durability as there are fewer moving parts to fail.

When programmed or calibrated for off-road use, traction control systems like Ford’s four-wheel electronic traction control (ETC) which is included with AdvanceTrac, and Porsche’s four-wheel automatic brake differential (ABD), can send 100 percent of torque to any one wheel or wheels, via an aggressive brake strategy or "brake locking", allowing vehicles like the Expedition and Cayenne to keep moving, even with two wheels (one front, one rear) completely off the ground.

=== Use in motorsports ===
Very effective yet small units are available that allow the driver to remove the traction control system after an event if desired. In Formula One, an effort to ban traction control led to a change of rules for 2008: every car must have a standard (but custom mappable) ECU, issued by the FIA, which is relatively basic and does not have traction control capabilities. In 2003, Paul Tracy admitted that CART teams used traction control in the nineties, a device that was not formally legal until 2002 (although the switch to single engine supplier for 2003 reverted the legalization). In 2008, NASCAR suspended a Whelen Modified Tour driver, crew chief, and car owner for one race and disqualified the team after finding questionable wiring in the ignition system, which could have been used to implement traction control.

== Traction control in cornering ==
Traction control is not just used for improving acceleration under slippery conditions. It can also help a driver to corner more safely. If too much throttle is applied during cornering, the driven wheels will lose traction and slide sideways. This occurs as understeer in front-wheel-drive vehicles and oversteer in rear-wheel-drive vehicles. Traction control can mitigate and possibly even correct understeer or oversteer from happening by limiting power to the overdriven wheel or wheels. However, it cannot increase the limits of frictional grip available and is used only to decrease the effect of driver error or compensate for a driver's inability to react quickly enough to wheel slip.

Automobile manufacturers state in vehicle manuals that traction control systems should not encourage dangerous driving or encourage driving in conditions beyond the driver's control.

== See also ==
- Car safety
