= Hubbell Incorporated =

American industrial company

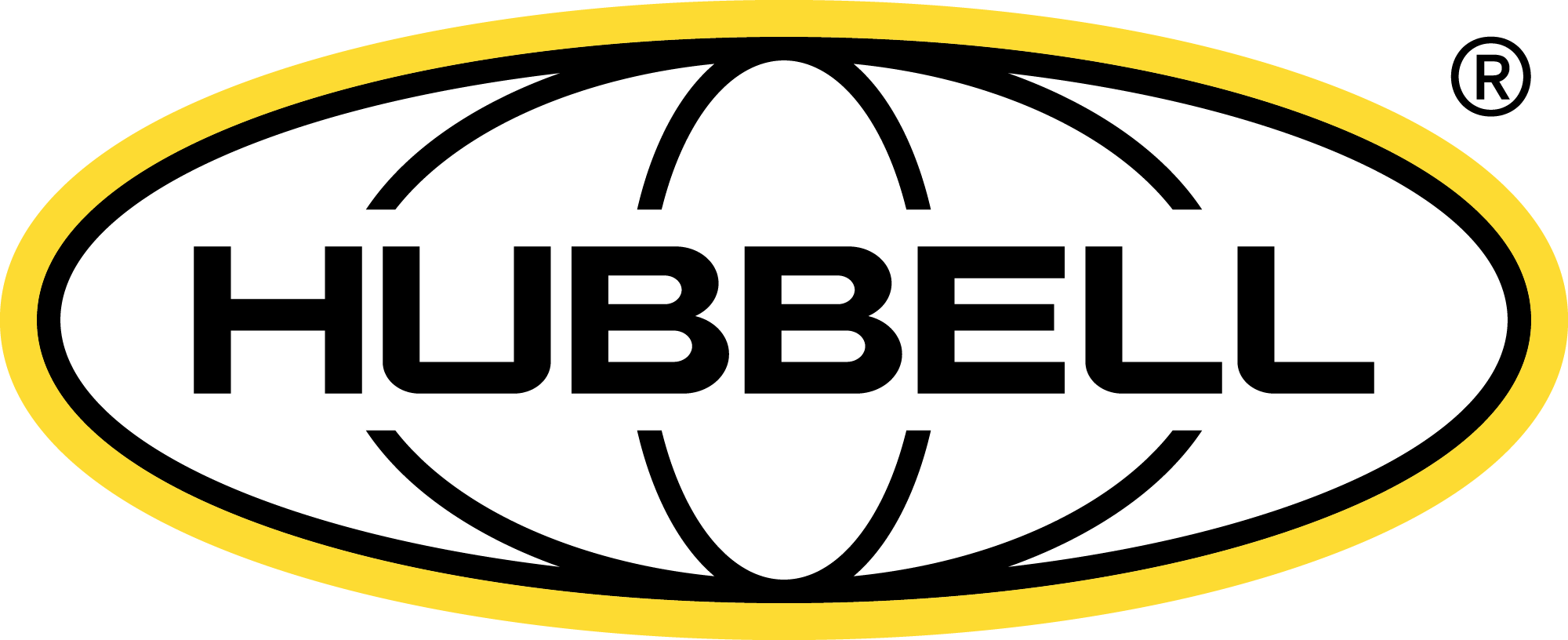

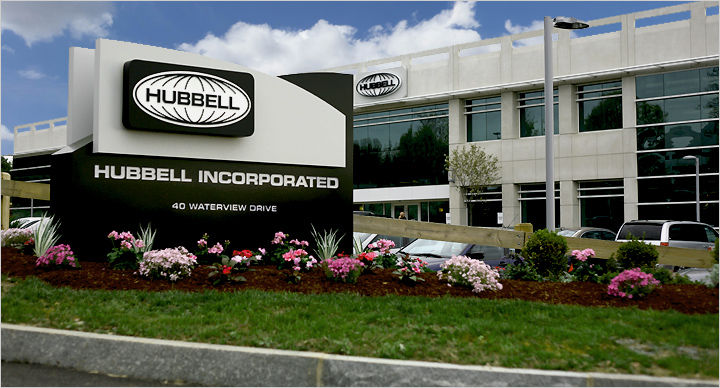
- Hubbell headquarters
- Type: Public
- Traded as: NYSE: HUBB; S&P 500 component
- Industry: Electronics
- Founded: 1888; 138 years ago
- Founder: Harvey Hubbell
- Headquarters: Shelton, Connecticut, United States
- Number of locations: 98
- Key people: Gerben Bakker (chairman, president and CEO)
- Revenue: ▲US$5.84 billion (2025)
- Net income: ▲US$887 million (2025)
- Number of employees: 17,700 (2024)
- Website: www.hubbell.com

Hubbell Incorporated, headquartered in Shelton, Connecticut, is an American company that designs, manufactures, and sells electrical and electronic products for non-residential and residential construction, industrial, and utility applications. Hubbell was founded by Harvey Hubbell as a proprietorship in 1888, and was incorporated in Connecticut in 1905.

The company is ranked 651st on the Fortune 500 list of the largest United States corporations by total revenue.

The company operates two segments: the utility solutions segment, which produces items such as arresters, insulators, connectors, anchors, bushings, enclosures, cutoffs and switches and the electrical solutions segment, which produces application wiring device products, rough-in electrical products, connector and grounding products, and lighting fixtures, as well as other electrical equipment.

Hubbell has manufacturing facilities in the United States, Canada, Switzerland, Puerto Rico, Mexico, China, Italy, the United Kingdom, Brazil and Australia and maintains sales offices in Singapore, China, India, Mexico, South Korea, and countries in the Middle East.

== History ==
Hubbell Incorporated was founded as a proprietorship in 1888 by Harvey Hubbell II. Born in Connecticut in 1857, he was a U.S. inventor, entrepreneur, and industrialist. Hubbell's best-known inventions are the U.S. electrical plug and the pull-chain light socket. Hubbell graduated from high school and began working for companies manufacturing marine engines and printing machinery. During this time, he accumulated several ideas for new inventions, and in 1888, he set out on his own, opening a small manufacturing facility in Bridgeport, Connecticut. Hubbell's first product was taken from his own patent for a paper roll holder with a toothed blade for use in stores that sold wrapping paper. This cutter stand became a tremendous success; it was a common feature of retail stores that used wrapping paper in the early 1900s and remained widely used into the late 20th century.

Soon, Hubbell discovered that he had to design machinery to make its parts. One of the first was a tapping machine, as was its patent. Around 1896, with his business in machinery progressing, Hubbell's next patent was a major breakthrough in the fastener industry: the process and machinery for cold rolled screw threads which reduced the rate of material lost in production by more than 50%. He designed and built progressive blanking and forming dies, patented machinery to slot screw heads, a machine to assemble screws and small parts, devised tools to indicate speed, and patented a changeable speed screwdriver. Hubbell's idea was to provide convenience, safety, and control to an electric light with his new "pull socket" which was patented in August 1896. The same familiar device with its on/off pull chain is still in use today. Hubbell built three prototypes by hand using metal and insulated wood parts to design a product with individual wires permanently attached in the proper sequence and correct polarity, and one which could be connected or disconnected, easily and safely, to a power supply in the wall. Cartridge fuses and fuse block, lamp holders, key sockets, soon followed the same path Later, Hubbell's "separable plug" design took shape on the drawing board back in Bridgeport, and then submitted to the patent office in Washington, D.C. Additional designs based on that basic concept separable plugs in different configurations, a single flush mounted receptacle as well as new products for electrical circuits. One of the most successful and familiar today, was the duplex receptacle which is still found everywhere that electrical power is used.

In 1901, Hubbell published a 12-page catalogue that listed 63 electrical products of his company's manufacture, and four years later he incorporated his enterprise as Harvey Hubbell, Incorporated. In the same year, the company registered its trademark of "...a sphere with meridian lines and the name 'Hubbell' centered within". Hubbell's pace of new ideas and product design did not falter. In 1909, the company began constructing a four-floor factory and office building that would become the first building in New England made of reinforced concrete.

Between 1896 and 1909, he was granted 45 patents on a wide variety of electrical products company's product lines had been continuously expanded. Catalogue No. 17 was published in March 1917. The catalogue had more than 100 pages and listed more than a thousand products. In bulb sockets alone, the company manufactured 277 different types and sizes. Hubbell's toggle action light switch which incorporated a "quick make or break" feature to meet the rigid requirements of Underwriters' Laboratories (UL) was replacing the former two button type push switch. Hubbell designed a "Loxin" mechanism which fit into any standard socket and locked the bulb in place. Falling lightbulbs no longer endangered streetcar passengers, and overly thrifty commuters had to find a new source of replacement bulbs for home use. For the home, the company developed a system for lighting fixture connections called "Elexit" which allowed the homeowner to install most fixtures without hiring an electrician.

Company's first era ended when its founder Harvey Hubbell II died on December 17, 1927. He was succeeded as president of the company by his son, Harvey Hubbell III. Twenty-six years old when he succeeded his father, Harvey Hubbell III had already spent years working in the business. That early experience with electrical equipment engineering and learning the discipline of production was to stand the company in good stead in the decades to come.

Harvey Hubbell III soon showed that he had inherited his father's twin acumen for product innovation and business development. In product innovation, he devised the company's lines of Twist-Lock industrial connectors with new 2-, 3-, and 4-wire devices of various ratings, designed a whole new series of locking connectors for industrial use which he named "Hubbellock", and introduced heavy-duty, circuit-breaking devices. The company played a large part in the war effort by meeting the demand for electrical components and systems to power the nation's industries and by developing products for the special applications needed by the military. These included components for military vehicle electrical circuits, battery-charging systems for M-4 tanks, power jacks for test meters, vacuum tube sockets for radio communications, and a line of electrical and electronic connectors for aircraft. The company's years of experience in building devices reliable enough for industrial use was a valuable asset in the production of products that could perform under rugged battlefield conditions. A second plant was opened in Lexington, Kentucky, in order to meet the demand and as a safety measure since the main plant in Bridgeport was considered vulnerable to air or sea attack.

Hubbell Inc. assisted Allied efforts during World War II by manufacturing military vehicle electrical circuits, battery-charging systems for M4 Sherman tanks, power jacks for test meters, vacuum tube sockets for radio communications, and a line of electrical and electronic connectors for aircraft.

Hubbell had been one of the first to manufacture flush toggle switches for alternating current only. The first Safety Receptacle was designed and produced as were the original "grounding only" devices which helped to set the standards for the industry. And while Hubbell was busy on land, the company found new opportunities at sea. In 1952, the ocean liner "SS United States" was launched in Newport News, Virginia. Queen of the seas for many years, the ship was completely fitted with Hubbell wiring devices designed expressly for narrow stateroom partitions and to withstand the effects of salt air. An ardent yachtsman himself, Harvey Hubbell III designed a complete family of corrosion resistant devices including both on-board and dockside equipment for the expanding pleasure boat industry. Familiar sights at marinas today, these first products were so successful that alternative designs were produced for many industrial applications where corrosive atmospheres and materials posed challenges for standard wiring devices.

The company's sales in new products and continuing lines increased proportionately to these successes, but more was to come as Harvey Hubbell Incorporated added diversification. Beginning in 1960, the company entered a new period of rapidly expanding growth in both sales and income. Much of the growth resulted from the company's internal product development, a longstanding Hubbell tradition, and a source that expanded under the industry leadership of Harvey Hubbell III and other Hubbell engineers. A second source of growth through acquisition, from 1960 onwards to now, Hubbell Incorporated has acquired many companies working for power, electric, lighting sectors. Hubbell Incorporated has grown to be an international manufacturer of electrical and electronic products for a broad range of non-residential and residential construction, industrial, and utility applications.

In 2010, the company moved its headquarters from Orange, Connecticut to Shelton, Connecticut.

In October 2021, Hubbell announced an agreement to sell its Commercial and Industrial Lighting business to GE Current, a Daintree company (now Current Lighting Solutions). The agreement did not include Bell, Chalmit Lighting, Killark, or Progress Lighting (which all make lighting products).

In the first quarter of 2024, Hubbell completed the sale of Progress Lighting. In 2023, Progress Lighting had revenue of $187.1 million (Hubbell Lighting had revenue of $515 million in 2022) and the sale amounted to $131 million.

In March 2024, Hubbell was named one of Ethisphere Institute's World's Most Ethical Companies of the Year for the fourth time. In 2024, 136 honourees from 20 countries and 44 industries were recognised.

=== Acquisitions ===
Sortable table
Company or asset acquired	Location	Date	From	Products	Notes
Kellems Co. Inc	Shelton, Connecticut	1962	Kellems Co. Inc	Mesh grips, cord connectors, and wire management products	
Ohio Brass	Wadsworth, OH and Aiken, SC	1978	Ohio Brass	Polymer and porcelain insulators and arresters used in the transmission, substation, and distribution markets. Designs include suspension, station, and line post, as well as polymer insulator and arrester combinations for lightning protection.	
Killark	Fenton, MO	1985		Harsh and hazardous location products including enclosures, OEM solutions, distribution and control equipment, lighting, plugs and receptacles, connectors and fittings.	
Bell Electric Company	Chicago, IL	1986	Square D	Weatherproof boxes, covers and enclosures as well as outdoor lighting solutions for commercial and residential applications.	
Bryant Electric Company	Bridgeport, Connecticut, United States	1991	Bryant Electric Company	Wiring devices, electrical components, and switches	
Haefely Hipotronics	United States, Switzerland	1992	Haefely Hipotronics	EMC Test Equipments, High Voltage Test system, Instruments, OEM Equipments	
E. M. Wiegmann, Inc.	St. Louis	1993	E. M. Wiegmann, Inc	Fabricates cabinets, panels, and other enclosures	
A. B. Chance Industries, Inc	Centralia, MO 65240 USA	1994	A. B. Chance Industries, Inc	Electric utility transmission and distribution products for the telecommunication, construction, pipeline, and consumer markets.	
Anderson Electrical Products	StLeeds AL 35094	January 2, 1996	Square D Company	Electrical connectors, clamps, fittings and accessories for substations, transmission and distribution lines, crimping tool.	
Gleason Reel Corp.	Mayville, Wisconsin	January 31, 1996	Gleason Reel Corp	Manufactures cable and hose reels, protective steel and nylon cable traks (cable and hose carriers), cable festooning hardware, container crane reels, slip rings, workstation accessories and components such as balancers, retractors, torque reels, and column, tool support, boom and jib kits.	
Fargo Manufacturing Company, Inc	Poughkeepsie, New York	February 14, 1997	Fargo Manufacturing Company, Inc	Manufacture distribution and transmission line products for the electric utilities.	
Devine Lighting	Kansas City, MO	1998		Architectural, Step Lights & Surface Mount	
Sterner Lighting	Eden Prairie, MN	1998,		Extruded Site & Precision Flood lighting	
Chalmit Lighting	Hilington, Scotland	1998,		Lighting for Harsh & Hazardous Area	
Siescor Technologies, Inc	Tulsa, OK	1998,	Siescor Technologies, Inc	Manufactures digital loop carrier systems used to connect subscribers to central office telephone switches, fiber and digital microwave networks.	
Certain Assets of Chardon Electrical Components, Inc.	Greenville, TN	February, 1999,	Chardon Electrical Components, Inc.	Manufacture loadbreak and deadbreak products, splices, and terminations.	
Haefely Test AG	Basel, Switzerland	July, 1999,	Trench Switzerland AG	High voltage test systems, instrumentation equipment, electromagnetic test equipment used in compliance testing of telecommunications and Local Area Network Systems (LANS).	
GAI-Tronics Corporation	Mohnton, Pennsylvania	July, 2000	GAI-Tronics Corporation	Supplier of communications systems designed for indoor, outdoor, and hazardous environments.	
MyTech Corporation	Austin, Texas	October, 2001	MyTech Corporation	Manufacture sensors, high intensity discharge ("HID") dimming controls, photocells and other lighting related electronic control products.	Is included in Electrical Segment
Hawke Cable Glands Limited	Ashton-Under-Lyne, England	March, 2002	Hawke Cable Glands Limited	Manufacture cable glands, cable connectors, light fixtures, control centers, panel boards, motor control enclosures and electrical equipment, cable transit, breathers, and field bus products.	Is included in Electrical Segment
LCA Group, Inc. [Lighting Corporation of America]	S. Houston, TX 77587-3028	March, 2002	U.S. Industries, Inc.	Manufacture outdoor and indoor lighting products.	
Atlas		2005		Civil helical anchor business	
Fabrica de Pecas Electricas Delmar LTDA	Brazil	2005		Manufacturer of surge arresters, cutouts, and utility products	
Victor Lighting	United Kingdom	2005		Above ground Lighting and Cable Products for Harsh, Hazardous, & Industrial Areas	
Strongwell Lenoir City, Inc	Lenoir City, TN	June, 2006	Strongwell Lenoir City, Inc	Manufacture concrete products, surface drain products.	Renamed Hubbell Lenoir City, Inc
Austdac Pty Limited	New South Wales, Australia	November 2006	Austdac Pty Limited	Manufacture hazardous applications utility products	Added to the Industrial Technology segment.
PCORE Electric Company, Inc	LeRoy, New York	October 2007	PCORE Electric Company, Inc	Manufacture high voltage condenser bushings	Included in the Power segment
Kurt Versen, Inc.	Westwood, New Jersey	January 2008	Kurt Versen, Inc.	Manufacture lighting fixtures	Added to the lighting business within the Electrical segment.
USCO Power Equipment Corporation	Leeds, Alabama	August 2008	USCO Power Equipment Corporation	Provides switches and accessories to the electric utility industry.	Added to the Power segment
CDR Systems Corp.	Ormond Beach, Florida	September, 2008	CDR Systems Corp.	Manufactures polymer concrete and fiberglass.	Added to the Power segment
Varon Lighting Group, LLC	California, Florida, and Wisconsin	December, 2008	Varon Lighting Group, LLC	Provides lighting fixtures	Added to the lighting business within the Electrical segment.
Burndy LLC	Manchester, New Hampshire	October 2, 2009		Manufacturer and seller of compression and mechanical connectors; transmission and substation grounding connectors and overhead line connectors, cable accessories, battery tools, cable management systems	Added to electrical segment
Wiley Electronics	Manchester, New Hampshire	2011	Wiley Electronics	Provider of grounding, bonding, and cable management solutions for solar panel and rack mounting applications	
Metron Inc		2011		Fire pump control products manufacturer	
Cableform Incorporated	Delaware	2012		Mining and tunneling products	
TayMac Corporation		2012		Weatherproof 'while-in-use' outlet enclosures	
Trinetics		2012		Utility switches, capacitors and component parts	
Vantage Technology		2012		Plugs and connectors	
Continental Industries, Inc		2013	Continental Industries, Inc	Pipeline connectors and electrical connector products	
Connector Manufacturing Company		2013		Aluminum and copper connectors, offering mechanical and compression designs	
Norlux		2013		LED component	
Powerohm Resistors Inc., Pen-Cell Plastics Inc, Opti-Loop Fiber Cable and Accessories Inc, Reuel Inc, Litecontrol Corporation, RigPower LLC, RFL Electronics Inc.	(RFL Electronics- North America)	2014		Powerohm Resistors Inc. (resistors); Pen-Cell Plastics Inc. (utility enclosures); Opti-Loop Fiber Cable and Accessories Inc. (cable storage); Reuel Inc. (apparatus bushings and insulators); Litecontrol Corporation (Fluorescent and LED Lighting); RigPower LLC (single pole connectors); RFL Electronics Inc. (protective relays, multiplexors, telecontrols)	
Electric Controller and Manufacturing Company LLC, Acme Electric Corp., Turner Electric		2015		Electric Controller and Manufacturing Company LLC (mill-duty crane control products); Acme Electric Corp. (dry-type transformers and toroids); Turner Electric (disconnect switches)	
Aclara Technologies LLC	St. Louis, Missouri	5 February 2018		Electricity meters, Smart meters, Advanced Metering Infrastructure, Smart Grid Monitoring sensors	Added to Power segment
