= Slip ratio =

Representation of the slipping behavior of an automobile wheel

Slip ratio is a means of calculating and expressing the slipping behavior of the wheel of an automobile. It is of fundamental importance in the field of vehicle dynamics, as it allows to understand the relationship between the deformation of the tire and the longitudinal forces (i.e. the forces responsible for forward acceleration and braking) acting upon it. Furthermore, it is essential to the effectiveness of any anti-lock braking system.

When accelerating or braking a vehicle equipped with tires, the observed angular velocity of the tire does not match the expected velocity for pure rolling motion, which means there appears to be apparent sliding between outer surface of the rim and the road in addition to rolling due to deformation of the part of tire above the area in contact with the road. When driving on dry pavement the fraction of slip that is caused by actual sliding taking place between the road and the tire's contact patch is negligible in magnitude and thus does not in practice make slip ratio dependent on speed. It is only relevant in soft or slippery surfaces, like snow, mud, ice, etc and results constant speed difference in same road and load conditions independently of speed, and thus fraction of slip ratio due to that cause is inversely related to speed of the vehicle.

The difference between theoretically calculated forward speed based on angular speed of the rim and rolling radius, and actual speed of the vehicle, expressed as a percentage of the latter, is called ‘slip ratio’. This slippage is caused by the forces at the contact patch of the tire, not the opposite way, and is thus of fundamental importance to determine the accelerations a vehicle can produce.

There is no universally agreed upon definition of slip ratio. The SAE J670 definition is, for tires pointing straight ahead:

$$\text{slip ratio}\ \% = \left ( 1- \frac{\Omega\,R_C}{V} \right ) \times 100\%$$

Where $\Omega$ is the angular velocity of the wheel, $R_C$ is the effective radius of the corresponding free-rolling tire, which can be calculated from the revolutions per kilometer, and $V$ is the forward velocity of the vehicle.
