= Power engineering =

Subfield of electrical engineering

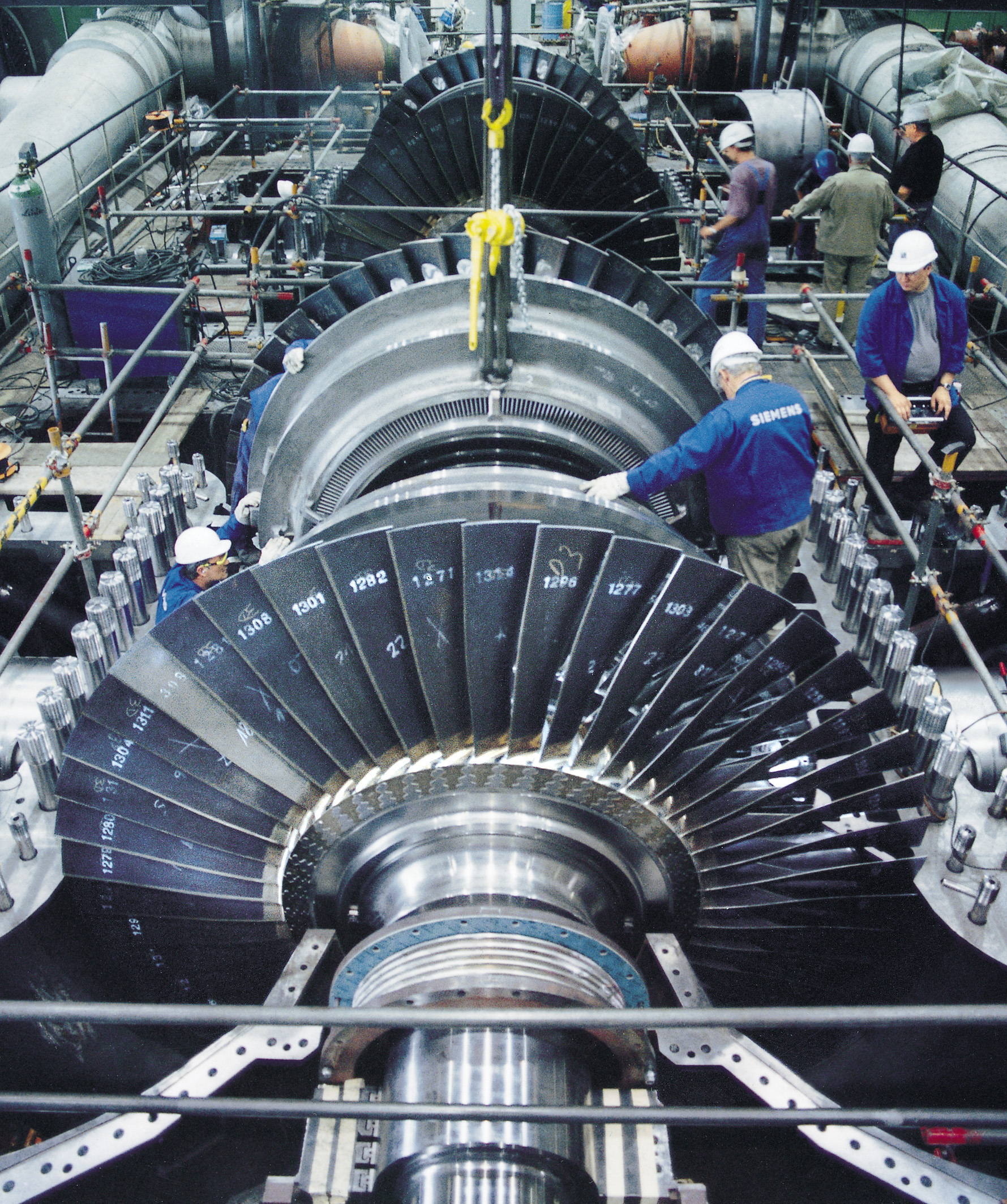
A steam turbine used to provide electric power

Power engineering, also called power systems engineering, is a subfield of electrical engineering that deals with the generation, transmission, distribution, and utilization of electric power, and the electrical apparatus connected to such systems. Although much of the field is concerned with the problems of three-phase AC power – the standard for large-scale power transmission and distribution across the modern world – a significant fraction of the field is concerned with the conversion between AC and DC power and the development of specialized power systems such as those used in aircraft or for electric railway networks. Power engineering draws the majority of its theoretical base from electrical engineering and mechanical engineering.

== History ==
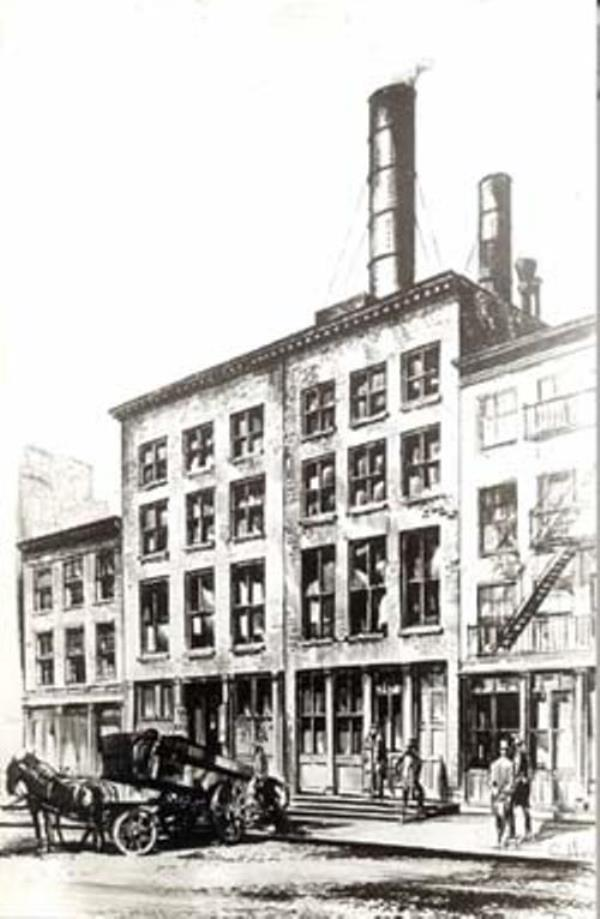
A sketch of the Pearl Street Station, the first steam-powered electric power station in New York City

=== Pioneering years ===
Electricity became a subject of scientific interest in the late 17th century. Over the next two centuries a number of important discoveries were made including the incandescent light bulb and the voltaic pile. Probably the greatest discovery with respect to power engineering came from Michael Faraday who in 1831 discovered that a change in magnetic flux induces an electromotive force in a loop of wire—a principle known as electromagnetic induction that helps explain how generators and transformers work.

In 1881 two electricians built the world's first power station at Godalming in England. The station employed two waterwheels to produce an alternating current that was used to supply seven Siemens arc lamps at 250 volts and thirty-four incandescent lamps at 40 volts. However supply was intermittent and in 1882 Thomas Edison and his company, The Edison Electric Light Company, developed the first steam-powered electric power station on Pearl Street in New York City. The Pearl Street Station consisted of several generators and initially powered around 3,000 lamps for 59 customers. The power station used direct current and operated at a single voltage. Since the direct current power could not be easily transformed to the higher voltages necessary to minimise power loss during transmission, the possible distance between the generators and load was limited to around half-a-mile (800 m).

That same year in London Lucien Gaulard and John Dixon Gibbs demonstrated the first transformer suitable for use in a real power system. The practical value of Gaulard and Gibbs' transformer was demonstrated in 1884 at Turin where the transformer was used to light up forty kilometres (25 miles) of railway from a single alternating current generator. Despite the success of the system, the pair made some fundamental mistakes. Perhaps the most serious was connecting the primaries of the transformers in series so that switching one lamp on or off would affect other lamps further down the line. Following the demonstration George Westinghouse, an American entrepreneur, imported a number of the transformers along with a Siemens generator and set his engineers to experimenting with them in the hopes of improving them for use in a commercial power system.

One of Westinghouse's engineers, William Stanley, recognised the problem with connecting transformers in series as opposed to parallel and also realised that making the iron core of a transformer a fully enclosed loop would improve the voltage regulation of the secondary winding. Using this knowledge he built the world's first practical transformer based alternating current power system at Great Barrington, Massachusetts in 1886. In 1885 the Italian physicist and electrical engineer Galileo Ferraris demonstrated an induction motor and in 1887 and 1888 the Serbian-American engineer Nikola Tesla filed a range of patents related to power systems including one for a practical two-phase induction motor which Westinghouse licensed for his AC system.

By 1890 the power industry had flourished and power companies had built thousands of power systems (both direct and alternating current) in the United States and Europe – these networks were effectively dedicated to providing electric lighting. During this time a fierce rivalry in the US known as the "war of the currents" emerged between Edison and Westinghouse over which form of transmission (direct or alternating current) was superior. In 1891, Westinghouse installed the first major power system that was designed to drive an electric motor and not just provide electric lighting. The installation powered a 100 horsepower (75 kW) synchronous motor at Telluride, Colorado with the motor being started by a Tesla induction motor. On the other side of the Atlantic, Oskar von Miller built a 20 kV 176 km three-phase transmission line from Lauffen am Neckar to Frankfurt am Main for the Electrical Engineering Exhibition in Frankfurt. In 1895, after a protracted decision-making process, the Adams No. 1 generating station at Niagara Falls began transmitting three-phase alternating current power to Buffalo at 11 kV. Following completion of the Niagara Falls project, new power systems increasingly chose alternating current as opposed to direct current for electrical transmission.

=== Twentieth century ===
==== Power engineering and Bolshevism ====
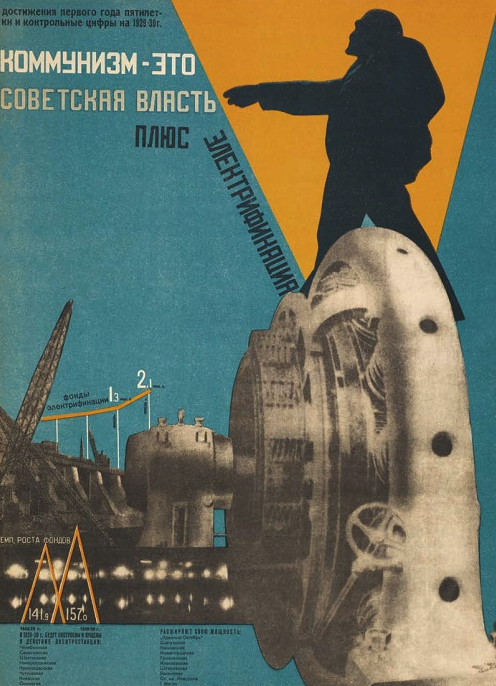
1929 poster by Gustav Klutsis

The generation of electricity was regarded as particularly important following the Bolshevik seizure of power. Lenin stated "Communism is Soviet power plus the electrification of the whole country." He was subsequently featured on many Soviet posters, stamps etc. presenting this view. The GOELRO plan was initiated in 1920 as the first Bolshevik experiment in industrial planning and in which Lenin became personally involved. Gleb Krzhizhanovsky was another key figure involved, having been involved in the construction of a power station in Moscow in 1910. He had also known Lenin since 1897 when they were both in the St. Petersburg chapter of the Union of Struggle for the Liberation of the Working Class.

==== Power engineering in the USA ====
In 1936 the first commercial high-voltage direct current (HVDC) line using mercury-arc valves was built between Schenectady and Mechanicville, New York. HVDC had previously been achieved by installing direct current generators in series (a system known as the Thury system) although this suffered from serious reliability issues. In 1957 Siemens demonstrated the first solid-state rectifier (solid-state rectifiers are now the standard for HVDC systems) however it was not until the early 1970s that this technology was used in commercial power systems. In 1959 Westinghouse demonstrated the first circuit breaker that used SF_{6} as the interrupting medium. SF_{6} is a far superior dielectric to air and, in recent times, its use has been extended to produce far more compact switching equipment (known as switchgear) and transformers. Many important developments also came from extending innovations in the ICT field to the power engineering field. For example, the development of computers meant load flow studies could be run more efficiently allowing for much better planning of power systems. Advances in information technology and telecommunication also allowed for much better remote control of the power system's switchgear and generators.

== Power ==
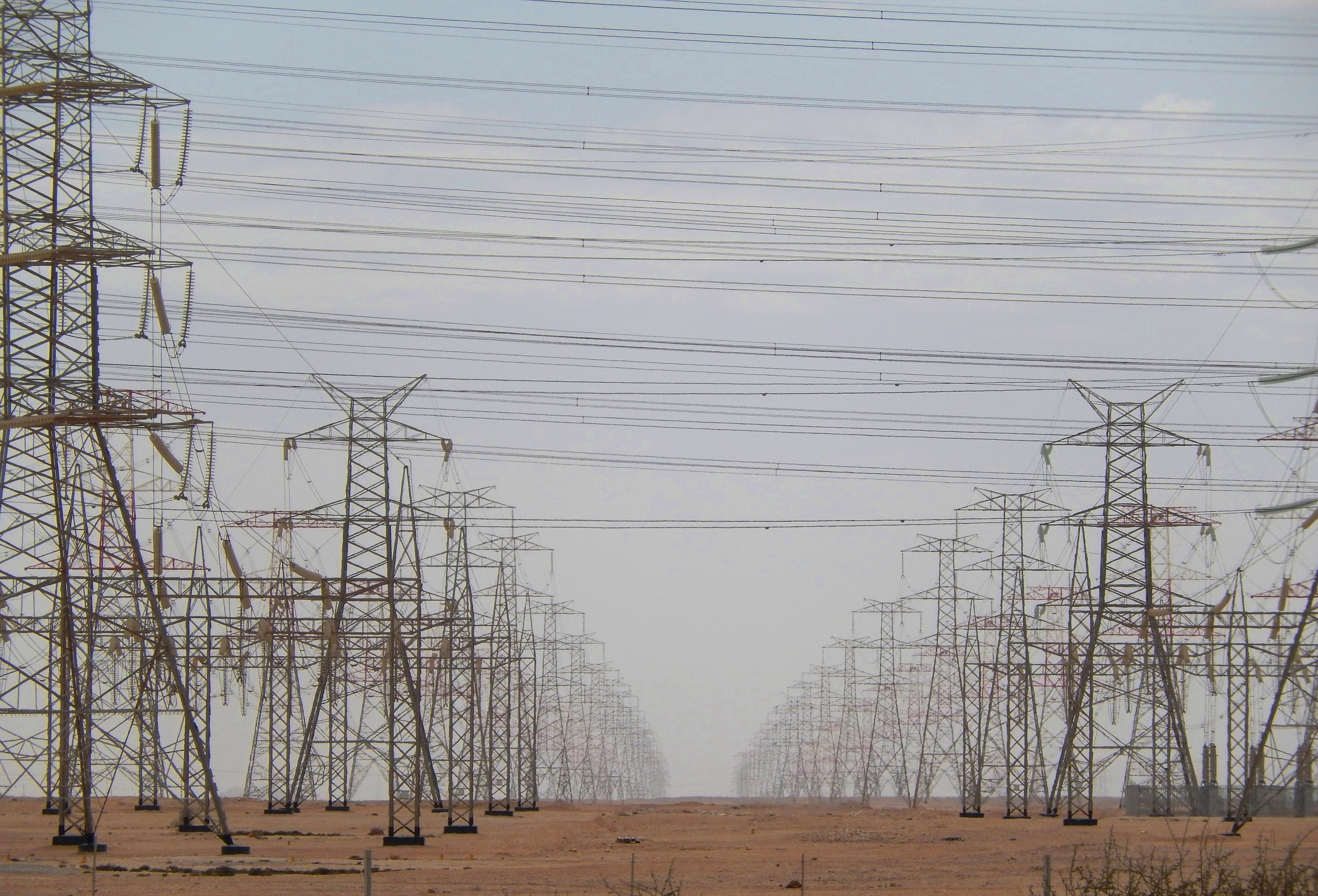
Transmission lines transmit power across the grid.

Power Engineering deals with the generation, transmission, distribution and utilization of electricity as well as the design of a range of related devices. These include transformers, electric generators, electric motors and power electronics.

Power engineers may also work on systems that do not connect to the grid. These systems are called off-grid power systems and may be used in preference to on-grid systems for a variety of reasons. For example, in remote locations it may be cheaper for a mine to generate its own power rather than pay for connection to the grid and in most mobile applications connection to the grid is simply not practical.

== Fields ==
Electricity generation covers the selection, design and construction of facilities that convert energy from primary forms to electric power.

Electric power transmission requires the engineering of high voltage transmission lines and substation facilities to interface to generation and distribution systems. High voltage direct current systems are one of the elements of an electric power grid.

Electric power distribution engineering covers those elements of a power system from a substation to the end customer.

Power system protection is the study of the ways an electrical power system can fail, and the methods to detect and mitigate for such failures.

In most projects, a power engineer must coordinate with many other disciplines such as civil and mechanical engineers, environmental experts, and legal and financial personnel. Major power system projects such as a large generating station may require scores of design professionals in addition to the power system engineers. At most levels of professional power system engineering practice, the engineer will require as much in the way of administrative and organizational skills as electrical engineering knowledge.

== Professional societies and international standards organizations ==
In both the UK and the US, professional societies had long existed for civil and mechanical engineers. The Institution of Electrical Engineers (IEE) was founded in the UK in 1871, and the AIEE in the United States in 1884. These societies contributed to the exchange of electrical knowledge and the development of electrical engineering education. On an international level, the International Electrotechnical Commission (IEC), which was founded in 1906, prepares standards for power engineering, with 20,000 electrotechnical experts from 172 countries developing global specifications based on consensus.

== 21st century developments ==
In the 21st century, power engineering has expanded due to global transitions toward cleaner, smarter, and more efficient energy systems. One of the most significant trends is the development of smart grids, which incorporate digital communication technologies, advanced sensors, and distributed control methods. These systems allow for real-time monitoring, response, and integration of changing renewable energies. In the United States, the Department of Energy's Grid Modernization Initiative emphasizes improving reliability, resilience, and efficiency, while addressing challenges such as cybersecurity (U.S. DOE, 2023).

Renewable energy integration has become very important to modern power engineering. The International Energy Agency (IEA) reports that solar panels and wind power are among the fastest-growing energy sources, with record growth expected through the 2030s (IEA, 2023). Power engineers are tasked with handling the variability that comes with renewable power generation through innovations like grid-forming inverters or hybrid plants that combine solar, wind, and large batteries.

Energy storage plays an important role in enabling renewable integration. The International Renewable Energy Agency (IRENA) highlights how falling battery costs are expanding utility-scale storage deployment and making decentralized storage solutions practical for homes and businesses (IRENA, 2017). Pumped hydro, flow batteries, and emerging technologies such as hydrogen-based storage are also receiving renewed attention as long-duration solutions.

Power electronics continues to change the field, providing the backbone for new renewable energy and high-voltage direct current transmission. Advances in semiconductor materials, such as silicon carbide and gallium nitride, have enabled converters that are more efficient and capable of operating at higher voltages. These technologies aid offshore wind, long-distance transmission, and more controllable power flows in complex grids.

== Climate change and decarbonization ==
Power engineering plays an important role in global strategies to mitigate climate change. The Intergovernmental Panel on Climate Change has emphasized the need to lower carbon emissions produced by power systems (IPCC, 2021). By moving away from fossil fuels and increasing renewable power generation, power engineers help reduce carbon emissions. Power Generation contributes to a large share of global greenhouse gases (EPA, 2022).

== Education and job market ==
Power engineering starts with a bachelor’s degree in electrical engineering, which can be paired with a concentration in power engineering and then followed by graduate study in power systems, renewable integration, or power electronics. The IEEE Power & Energy Society emphasizes the growing need for workforce development, particularly as utilities face waves of retirements and the transition to renewable systems. There is a demand for skilled power engineers that exceeds supply in many regions, making education and training a policy priority (IEEE, 2023).

== Regional contributions ==
In Asia, China and India have led large-scale renewable energy projects and innovated in high-voltage direct current transmission. The State Grid Corporation of China has built the world’s largest high-voltage direct current transmission projects, with distances exceeding 2,000 kilometers (ADB, 2018). In South America, Brazil has pioneered a system of hydroelectric power paired with fossil fuels and long-distance transmission across the Amazon (World Bank & ESMAP). In Africa, Kenya, South Africa, and Morocco are emerging leaders in geothermal, solar, and wind integration, often using microgrids to serve rural populations (World Bank & ESMAP).

== Expanded fields of power engineering ==
Electricity Generation: Modern generation engineering involves thermal, hydroelectric, and nuclear plants, as well as wind, solar, and biomass. Engineers must evaluate resource availability, environmental impacts, and challenges with integrating renewables into existing grids. (UCR, 2025)

Transmission Engineering: Transmission engineers design high-voltage direct current transmission links that reduce line losses and enable the connection of grids. Flexible AC Transmission Systems devices are also used to improve system stability. (UCR, 2025)

Distribution Engineering: Distribution networks now incorporate distributed energy resources such as rooftop solar panels, electric vehicle charging, and local storage. Engineers also design protection systems and automation strategies to increase reliability. (UCR, 2025)

Power System Protection: Modern protection systems employ digital relays, sensors, and wide-area monitoring to find and stop faults quickly. Cybersecurity has also become a growing part of power system protection. (UCR, 2025)

== Rural electrification and microgrids ==
Power engineering is important to rural electrification in regions where extending the traditional grid is uneconomical. Over 700 million people lack access to electricity, and most of them are in Sub-Saharan Africa and parts of Asia (IEA, 2017). Microgrids are local networks that can operate on their own. They typically integrate solar panels, small wind turbines, batteries, and diesel backup. Advances in technologies and lowering costs have made microgrids a large part of global energy initiatives (World Bank & ESMAP, 2023)

== See also ==
- Energy economics
- Industrial ecology
- Power electronics
- Power system simulation
- Power systems CAD
- Power engineering software
