= Electric power system =

Systems to distribute electricity

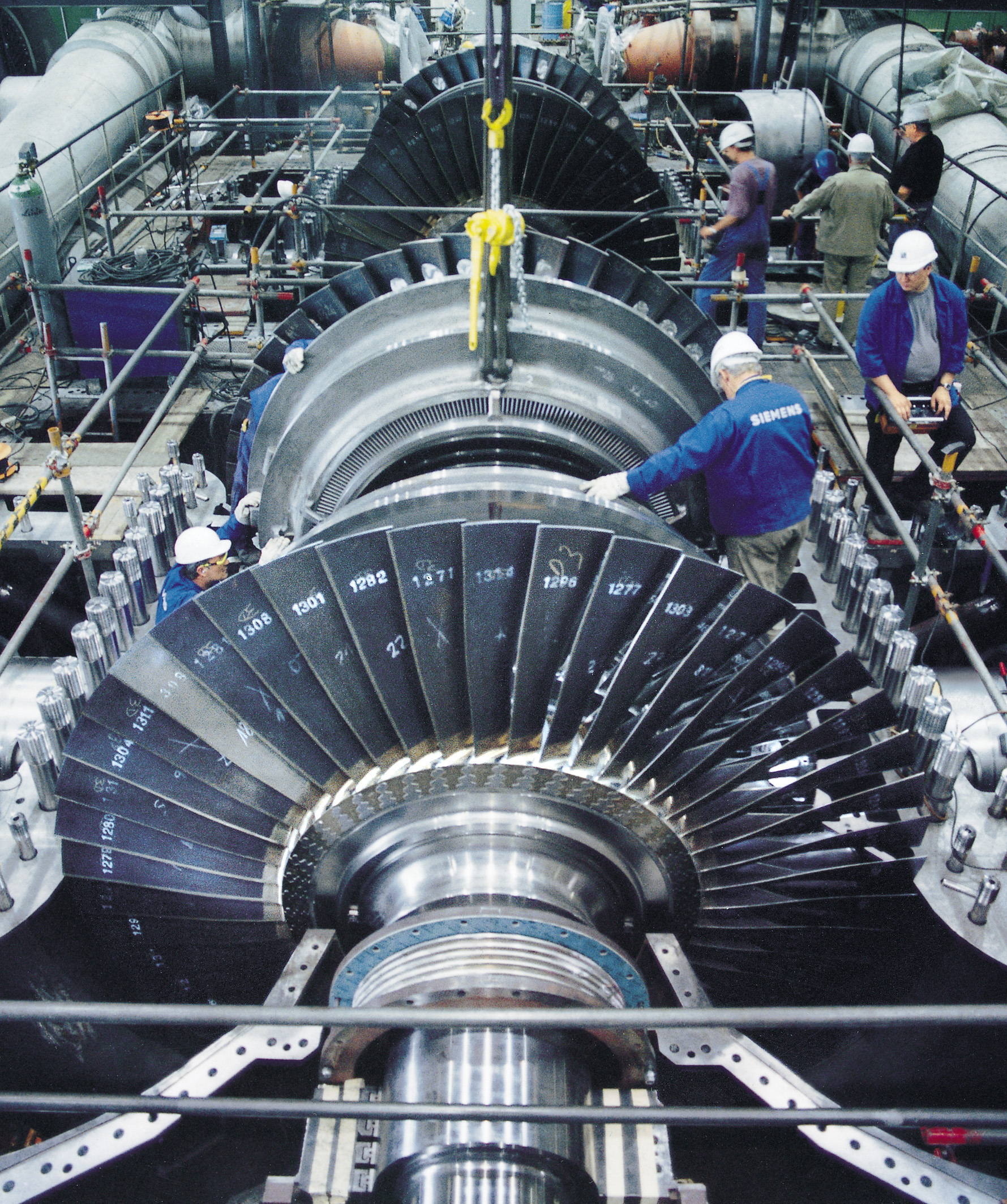
A steam turbine used to provide electric power

An electric power system is a network of electrical components deployed to supply, transfer, and use electric power. An example of a power system is the electrical grid that provides power to homes and industries within an extended area. The electrical grid can be broadly divided into the generators that supply the power, the transmission system that carries the power from the generating centers to the load centers, and the distribution system that feeds the power to nearby homes and industries.

Smaller power systems are also found in industry, hospitals, commercial buildings, and homes. A single line diagram helps to represent this whole system. The majority of these systems rely upon three-phase AC power—the standard for large-scale power transmission and distribution across the modern world. Specialized power systems that do not always rely upon three-phase AC power are found in aircraft, electric rail systems, ocean liners, submarines, and automobiles.

== History ==
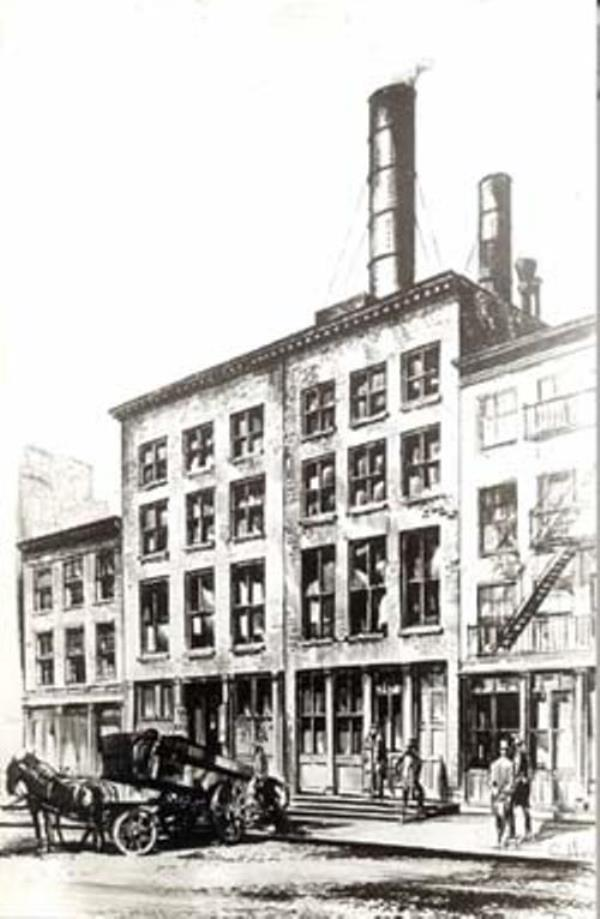
A sketch of the Pearl Street Station

In 1889, two electricians built the world's first power system at Godalming in England. It was powered by two water wheels and produced an alternating current that in turn supplied seven Siemens arc lamps at 250 volts and 34 incandescent lamps at 40 volts. However, supply to the lamps was intermittent and in 1882 Thomas Edison and his company, Edison Electric Light Company, developed the first steam-powered electric power station on Pearl Street in New York City. The Pearl Street Station initially powered around 3,000 lamps for 59 customers. The power station generated direct current and operated at a single voltage. Direct current power could not be transformed easily or efficiently to the higher voltages necessary to minimize power loss during long-distance transmission, so the maximum economic distance between the generators and load was limited to around half a mile (800 m).

That same year in London, Lucien Gaulard and John Dixon Gibbs demonstrated the "secondary generator"—the first transformer suitable for use in a real power system. The practical value of Gaulard and Gibbs' transformer was demonstrated in 1884 at Turin where the transformer was used to light up 40 kilometers (25 miles) of railway from a single alternating current generator. Despite the success of the system, the pair made some fundamental mistakes. Perhaps the most serious was connecting the primaries of the transformers in series so that active lamps would affect the brightness of other lamps further down the line.

In 1885, Ottó Titusz Bláthy working with Károly Zipernowsky and Miksa Déri perfected the secondary generator of Gaulard and Gibbs, providing it with a closed iron core and its present name: the "transformer". The three engineers went on to present a power system at the National General Exhibition of Budapest that implemented the parallel AC distribution system proposed by a British scientist (Note: Simply referred to in the literature as R. Kennedy) in which several power transformers have their primary windings fed in parallel from a high-voltage distribution line. The system lit more than 1000 carbon filament lamps and operated successfully from May until November of that year.

Also in 1885 George Westinghouse, an American entrepreneur, obtained the patent rights to the Gaulard-Gibbs transformer and imported a number of them along with a Siemens generator, and set his engineers to experimenting with them in hopes of improving them for use in a commercial power system. In 1886, one of Westinghouse's engineers, William Stanley, independently recognized the problem with connecting transformers in series as opposed to parallel and also realized that making the iron core of a transformer a fully enclosed loop would improve the voltage regulation of the secondary winding. Using this knowledge he built a multi-voltage transformer-based alternating-current power system serving multiple homes and businesses at Great Barrington, Massachusetts in 1886. The system was unreliable and short-lived, though, due primarily to generation issues. However, based on that system, Westinghouse would begin installing AC transformer systems in competition with the Edison Company later that year. In 1888, Westinghouse licensed Nikola Tesla's patents for a polyphase AC induction motor and transformer designs. Tesla consulted for a year at the Westinghouse Electric & Manufacturing Company but it took a further four years for Westinghouse engineers to develop a workable polyphase motor and transmission system.

By 1889, the electric power industry was flourishing, and power companies had built thousands of power systems (both direct and alternating current) in the United States and Europe. These networks were effectively dedicated to providing electric lighting. During this time the rivalry between Thomas Edison and George Westinghouse's companies had grown into a propaganda campaign over which form of transmission (direct or alternating current) was superior, a series of events known as the "war of the currents". In 1891, Westinghouse installed the first major power system that was designed to drive a 100 horsepower (75 kW) synchronous electric motor, as well as provide electric lighting, at Telluride, Colorado. On the other side of the Atlantic, Mikhail Dolivo-Dobrovolsky and Charles Eugene Lancelot Brown, built the first long-distance (175 kilometers (109 miles)) high-voltage (15 kV, then a record) three-phase transmission line from Lauffen am Neckar to Frankfurt am Main for the Electrical Engineering Exhibition in Frankfurt, where power was used to light lamps and run a water pump. In the United States the AC/DC competition came to an end when Edison General Electric was taken over by their chief AC rival, the Thomson-Houston Electric Company, forming General Electric. In 1895, after a protracted decision-making process, alternating current was chosen as the transmission standard with Westinghouse building the Adams No. 1 generating station at Niagara Falls and General Electric building the three-phase alternating current power system to supply Buffalo at 11 kV.

Developments in power systems continued beyond the nineteenth century. In 1936 the first experimental high voltage direct current (HVDC) line using mercury arc valves was built between Schenectady and Mechanicville, New York. HVDC had previously been achieved by series-connected direct current generators and motors (the Thury system) although this suffered from serious reliability issues. The first solid-state metal diode suitable for general power uses was developed by Ernst Presser at TeKaDe in 1928. It consisted of a layer of selenium applied on an aluminum plate. In 1957, a General Electric research group developed the first thyristor suitable for use in power applications, starting a revolution in power electronics. In that same year, Siemens demonstrated a solid-state rectifier, but it was not until the early 1970s that solid-state devices became the standard in HVDC, when GE emerged as one of the top suppliers of thyristor-based HVDC. In 1979, a European consortium including Siemens, Brown Boveri & Cie and AEG realized the record HVDC link from Cabora Bassa to Johannesburg, extending more than 1,420 kilometers (880 miles) that carried 1.9 GW at 533 kV.

In recent times, many important developments have come from extending innovations in the information and communications technology (ICT) field to the power engineering field. For example, the development of computers meant load flow studies could be run more efficiently, allowing for much better planning of power systems. Advances in information technology and telecommunication also allowed for effective remote control of a power system's switchgear and generators.

== Basics of electric power ==
Animation of three-phase alternating current

Electric power is the product of two quantities: current and voltage. These two quantities can vary with respect to time (AC power) or can be kept at constant levels (DC power).

Most refrigerators, air conditioners, pumps and industrial machinery use AC power, whereas most computers and digital equipment use DC power (digital devices plugged into the mains typically have an internal or external power adapter to convert from AC to DC power). AC power has the advantage of being easy to transform between voltages and is able to be generated and utilised by brushless machinery. DC power remains the only practical choice in digital systems and can be more economical to transmit over long distances at very high voltages (see HVDC).

The ability to easily transform the voltage of AC power is important for two reasons: firstly, power can be transmitted over long distances with less loss at higher voltages. So in power systems where generation is distant from the load, it is desirable to step-up (increase) the voltage of power at the generation point and then step-down (decrease) the voltage near the load. Secondly, it is often more economical to install turbines that produce higher voltages than would be used by most appliances, so the ability to easily transform voltages means this mismatch between voltages can be easily managed.

Solid-state devices, which are products of the semiconductor revolution, make it possible to transform DC power to different voltages, build brushless DC machines and convert between AC and DC power. Nevertheless, devices utilising solid-state technology are often more expensive than their traditional counterparts, so AC power remains in widespread use.

== Components of power systems ==
=== Supplies ===
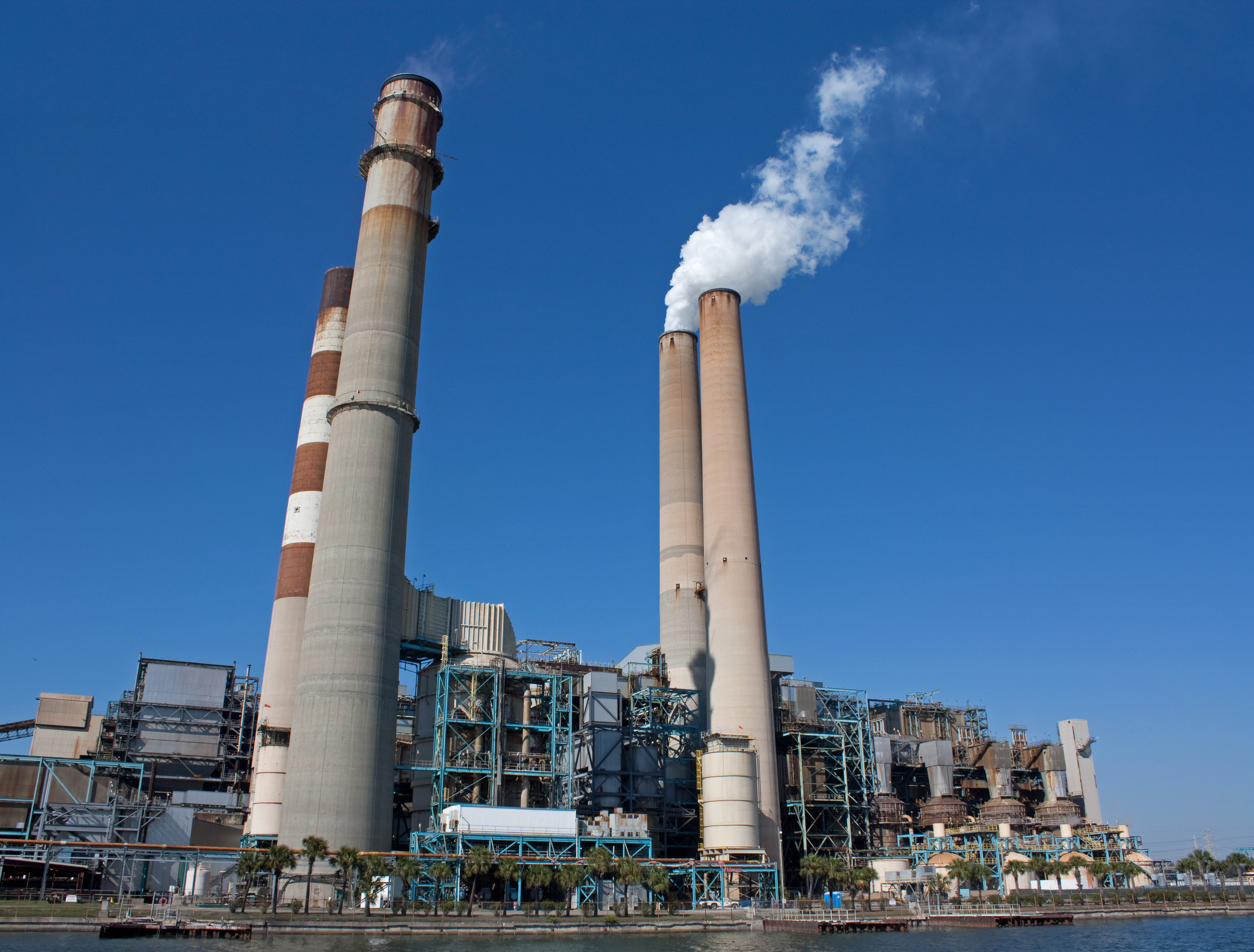
A majority of the world's power still comes from coal-fired power stations like this

All power systems have one or more sources of power. For some power systems, the source of power is external to the system but for others, it is part of the system itself—it is these internal power sources that are discussed in the remainder of this section. Direct current power can be supplied by batteries, fuel cells or photovoltaic cells. Alternating current power is typically supplied by a rotor that spins in a magnetic field in a device known as a turbo generator. There have been a wide range of techniques used to spin a turbine's rotor, from steam heated using fossil fuel (including coal, gas and oil) or nuclear energy to falling water (hydroelectric power) and wind (wind power).

The speed at which the rotor spins in combination with the number of generator poles determines the frequency of the alternating current produced by the generator. All generators on a single synchronous system, for example, the national grid, rotate at sub-multiples of the same speed and so generate electric current at the same frequency. If the load on the system increases, the generators will require more torque to spin at that speed and, in a steam power station, more steam must be supplied to the turbines driving them. Thus the steam used and the fuel expended directly relate to the quantity of electrical energy supplied. An exception exists for generators incorporating power electronics such as gearless wind turbines or linked to a grid through an asynchronous tie such as a HVDC link — these can operate at frequencies independent of the power system frequency.

Depending on how the poles are fed, alternating current generators can produce a variable number of phases of power. A higher number of phases leads to more efficient power system operation but also increases the infrastructure requirements of the system. Electricity grid systems connect multiple generators operating at the same frequency: the most common being three-phase at 50 or 60 Hz.

There are a range of design considerations for power supplies. These range from the obvious: How much power should the generator be able to supply? What is an acceptable length of time for starting the generator (some generators can take hours to start)? Is the availability of the power source acceptable (some renewables are only available when the sun is shining or the wind is blowing)? To the more technical: How should the generator start (some turbines act like a motor to bring themselves up to speed in which case they need an appropriate starting circuit)? What is the mechanical speed of operation for the turbine and consequently what are the number of poles required? What type of generator is suitable (synchronous or asynchronous) and what type of rotor (squirrel-cage rotor, wound rotor, salient pole rotor or cylindrical rotor)?

=== Loads ===
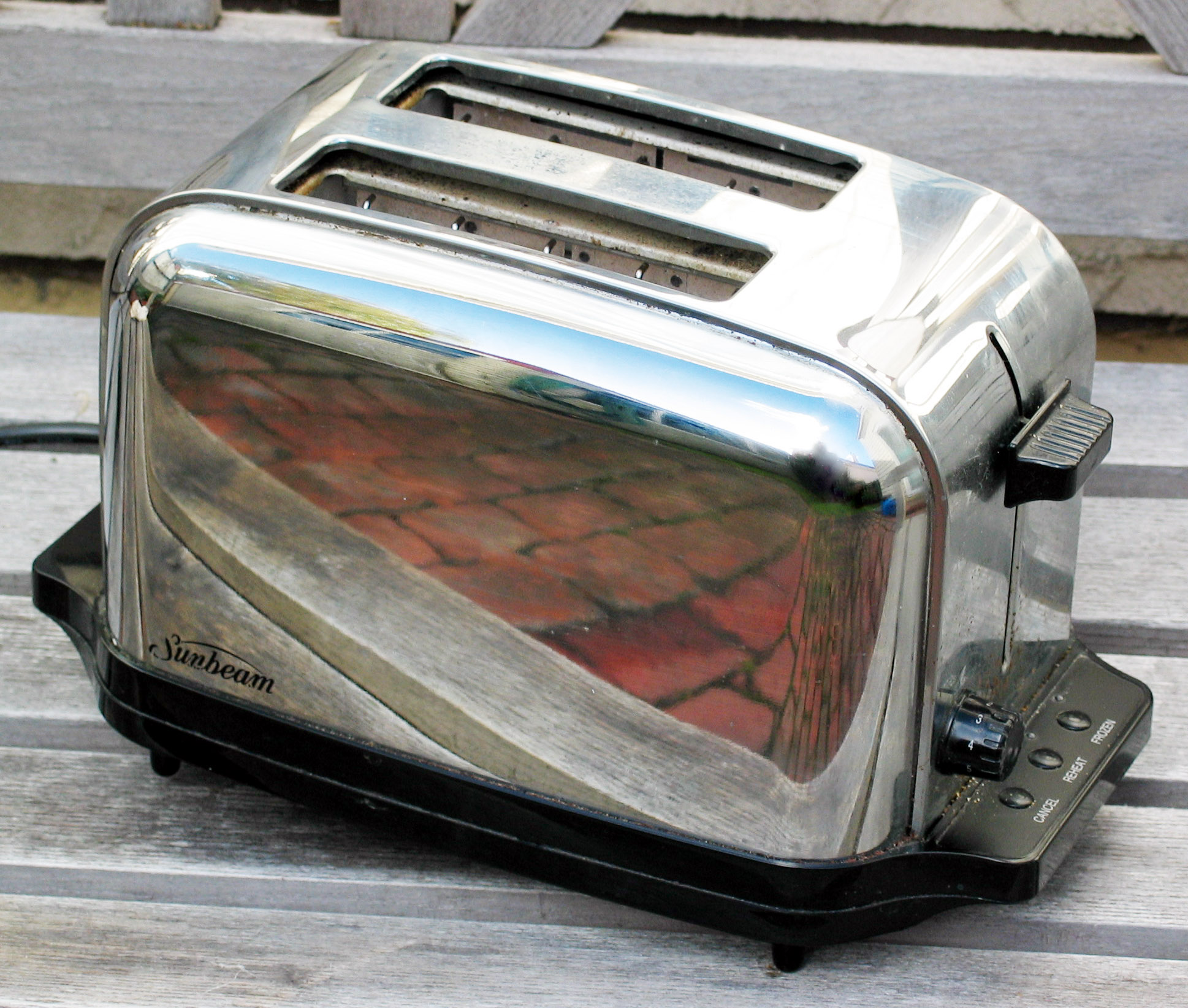
A toaster is a great example of a single-phase load that might appear in a residence. Toasters typically draw 2 to 10 amps at 110 to 260 volts consuming around 600 to 1200 watts of power.

Power systems deliver energy to loads that perform a function. These loads range from household appliances to industrial machinery. Most loads expect a certain voltage and, for alternating current devices, a certain frequency and number of phases. The appliances found in residential settings, for example, will typically be single-phase operating at 50 or 60 Hz with a voltage between 110 and 260 volts (depending on national standards). An exception exists for larger centralized air conditioning systems as these are now often three-phase because this allows them to operate more efficiently. All electrical appliances also have a wattage rating, which specifies the amount of power the device consumes. At any one time, the net amount of power consumed by the loads on a power system must equal the net amount of power produced by the supplies less the power lost in transmission.

Making sure that the voltage, frequency and amount of power supplied to the loads is in line with expectations is one of the great challenges of power system engineering. However it is not the only challenge, in addition to the power used by a load to do useful work (termed active or real power) many alternating current devices also use an additional amount of power because they cause the alternating voltage and alternating current to become slightly out of sync (termed reactive power). The reactive power like the active power must balance (that is the reactive power produced on a system must equal the reactive power consumed) and can be supplied from the generators, however it is often more economical to supply such power from capacitors (see "Capacitors and reactors" below for more details).

A final consideration with loads has to do with power quality. In addition to sustained overvoltages and undervoltages (voltage regulation issues) as well as sustained deviations from the system frequency (frequency regulation issues), power system loads can be adversely affected by a range of temporal issues. These include voltage sags, dips and swells, transient overvoltages, flicker, high-frequency noise, phase imbalance and poor power factor. Power quality issues occur when the power supply to a load deviates from the ideal. Power quality issues can be especially important when it comes to specialist industrial machinery or hospital equipment.

=== Conductors ===
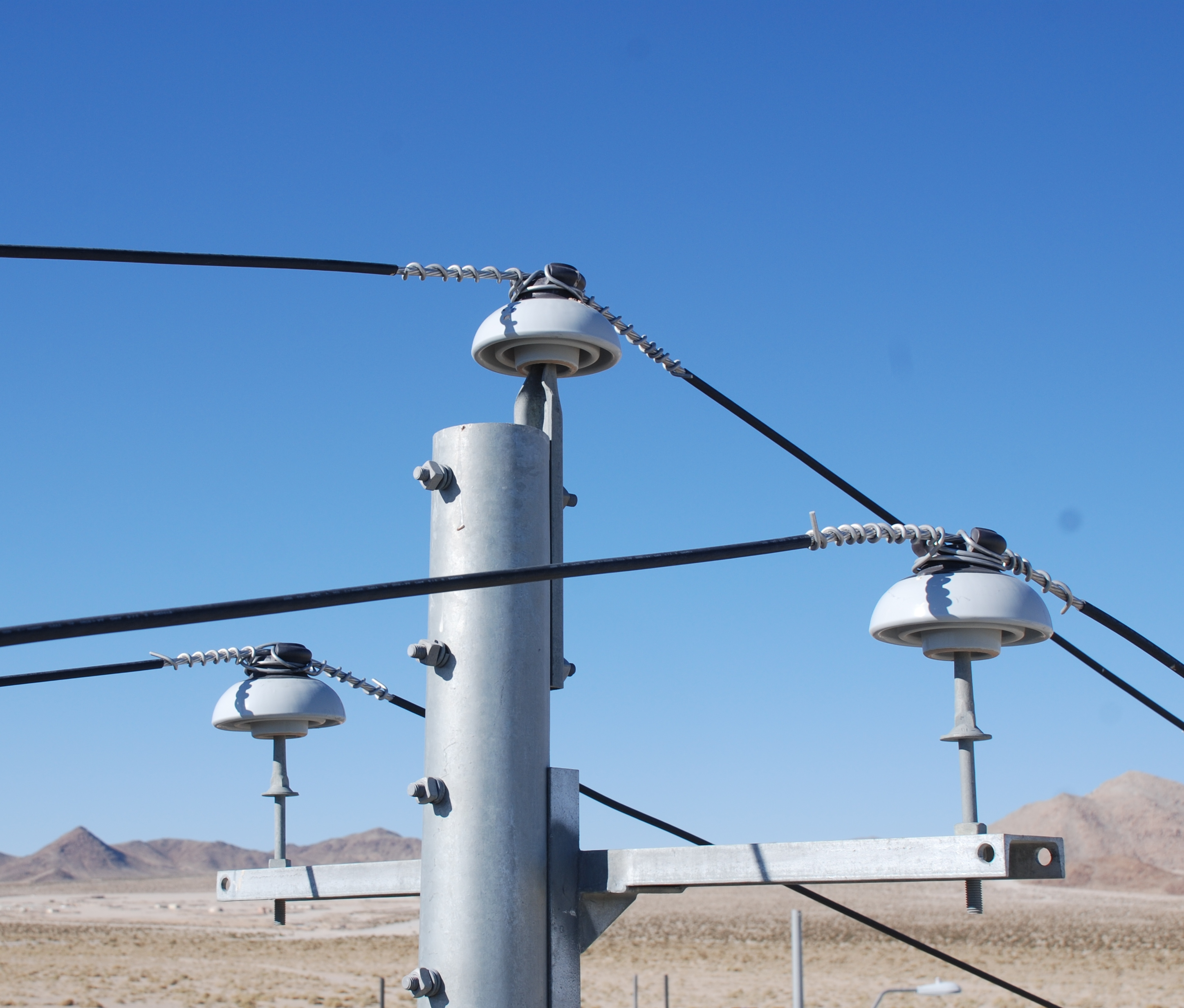
Partially insulated medium-voltage conductors in California

Conductors carry power from the generators to the load. In a grid, conductors may be classified as belonging to the transmission system, which carries large amounts of power at high voltages (typically more than 69 kV) from the generating centres to the load centres, or the distribution system, which feeds smaller amounts of power at lower voltages (typically less than 69 kV) from the load centres to nearby homes and industry.

Choice of conductors is based on considerations such as cost, transmission losses and other desirable characteristics of the metal like tensile strength. Copper, with lower resistivity than aluminum, was once the conductor of choice for most power systems. However, aluminum has a lower cost for the same current carrying capacity and is now often the conductor of choice. Overhead line conductors may be reinforced with steel or aluminium alloys.

Conductors in exterior power systems may be placed overhead or underground. Overhead conductors are usually air insulated and supported on porcelain, glass or polymer insulators. Cables used for underground transmission or building wiring are insulated with cross-linked polyethylene or other flexible insulation. Conductors are often stranded for to make them more flexible and therefore easier to install.

Conductors are typically rated for the maximum current that they can carry at a given temperature rise over ambient conditions. As current flow increases through a conductor it heats up. For insulated conductors, the rating is determined by the insulation. For bare conductors, the rating is determined by the point at which the sag of the conductors would become unacceptable.

=== Capacitors and reactors ===
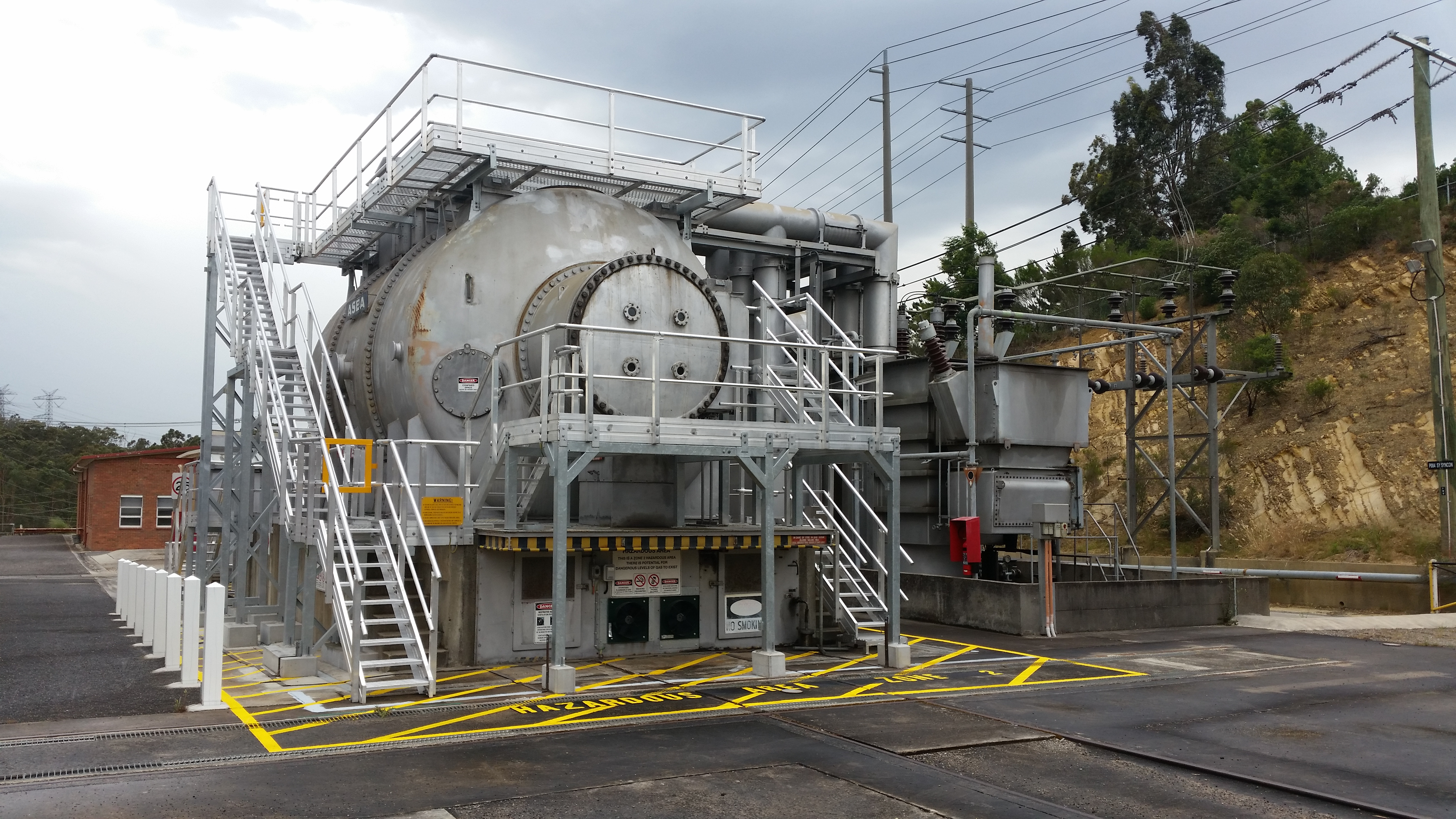
A synchronous condenser installation at Templestowe substation, Melbourne, Victoria

The majority of the load in a typical AC power system is inductive; the current lags behind the voltage. Since the voltage and current are out-of-phase, this leads to the emergence of reactive power. Reactive power does no measurable work but is transmitted back and forth between the reactive power source and load every cycle. This reactive power can be provided by the generators themselves but it is often cheaper to provide it through capacitors, hence capacitors are often placed near inductive loads (i.e. if not on-site at the nearest substation) to reduce current demand on the power system (i.e. increase the power factor).

Reactors consume reactive power and are used to regulate voltage on long transmission lines. In light load conditions, where the loading on transmission lines is well below the surge impedance loading, the efficiency of the power system may actually be improved by switching in reactors. Reactors installed in series in a power system also limit rushes of current flow, small reactors are therefore almost always installed in series with capacitors to limit the current rush associated with switching in a capacitor. Series reactors can also be used to limit fault currents.

Capacitors and reactors are switched by circuit breakers, which results in sizeable step changes of reactive power. A solution to this comes in the form of synchronous condensers, static VAR compensators and static synchronous compensators. Briefly, synchronous condensers are synchronous motors that spin freely to generate or absorb reactive power. Static VAR compensators work by switching in capacitors using thyristors as opposed to circuit breakers allowing capacitors to be switched-in and switched-out within a single cycle. This provides a far more refined response than circuit-breaker-switched capacitors. Static synchronous compensators take this a step further by achieving reactive power adjustments using only power electronics.

=== Power electronics ===
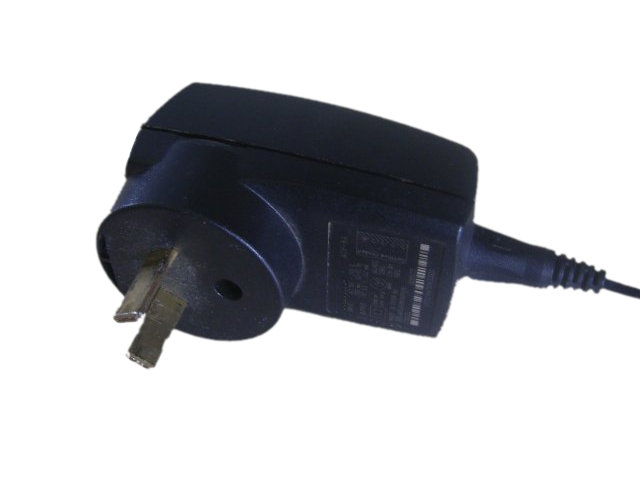
This external household AC to DC power adapter uses power electronics

Power electronics are semiconductor based devices that are able to switch quantities of power ranging from a few hundred watts to several hundred megawatts. Despite their relatively simple function, their speed of operation (typically in the order of nanoseconds) means they are capable of a wide range of tasks that would be difficult or impossible with conventional technology. The classic function of power electronics is rectification, or the conversion of AC-to-DC power, power electronics are therefore found in almost every digital device that is supplied from an AC source either as an adapter that plugs into the wall (see photo) or as component internal to the device. High-powered power electronics can also be used to convert AC power to DC power for long distance transmission in a system known as HVDC. HVDC is used because it proves to be more economical than similar high voltage AC systems for very long distances (hundreds to thousands of kilometres). HVDC is also desirable for interconnects because it allows frequency independence thus improving system stability. Power electronics are also essential for any power source that is required to produce an AC output but that by its nature produces a DC output. They are therefore used by photovoltaic installations.

Power electronics are also found in practically all modern petrol-powered vehicles, this is because the power provided by the car's batteries alone is insufficient to provide ignition, air-conditioning, internal lighting, radio and dashboard displays for the life of the car. So the batteries must be recharged while driving—a feat that is typically accomplished using power electronics.

Some electric railway systems also use DC power and thus make use of power electronics to feed grid power to the locomotives and often for speed control of the locomotive's motor. In the middle twentieth century, rectifier locomotives were popular, these used power electronics to convert AC power from the railway network for use by a DC motor. Today most electric locomotives are supplied with AC power and run using AC motors, but still use power electronics to provide suitable motor control. The use of power electronics to assist with the motor control and with starter circuits, in addition to rectification, is responsible for power electronics appearing in a wide range of industrial machinery. Power electronics even appear in modern residential air conditioners allow are at the heart of the variable speed wind turbine.

=== Protective devices ===
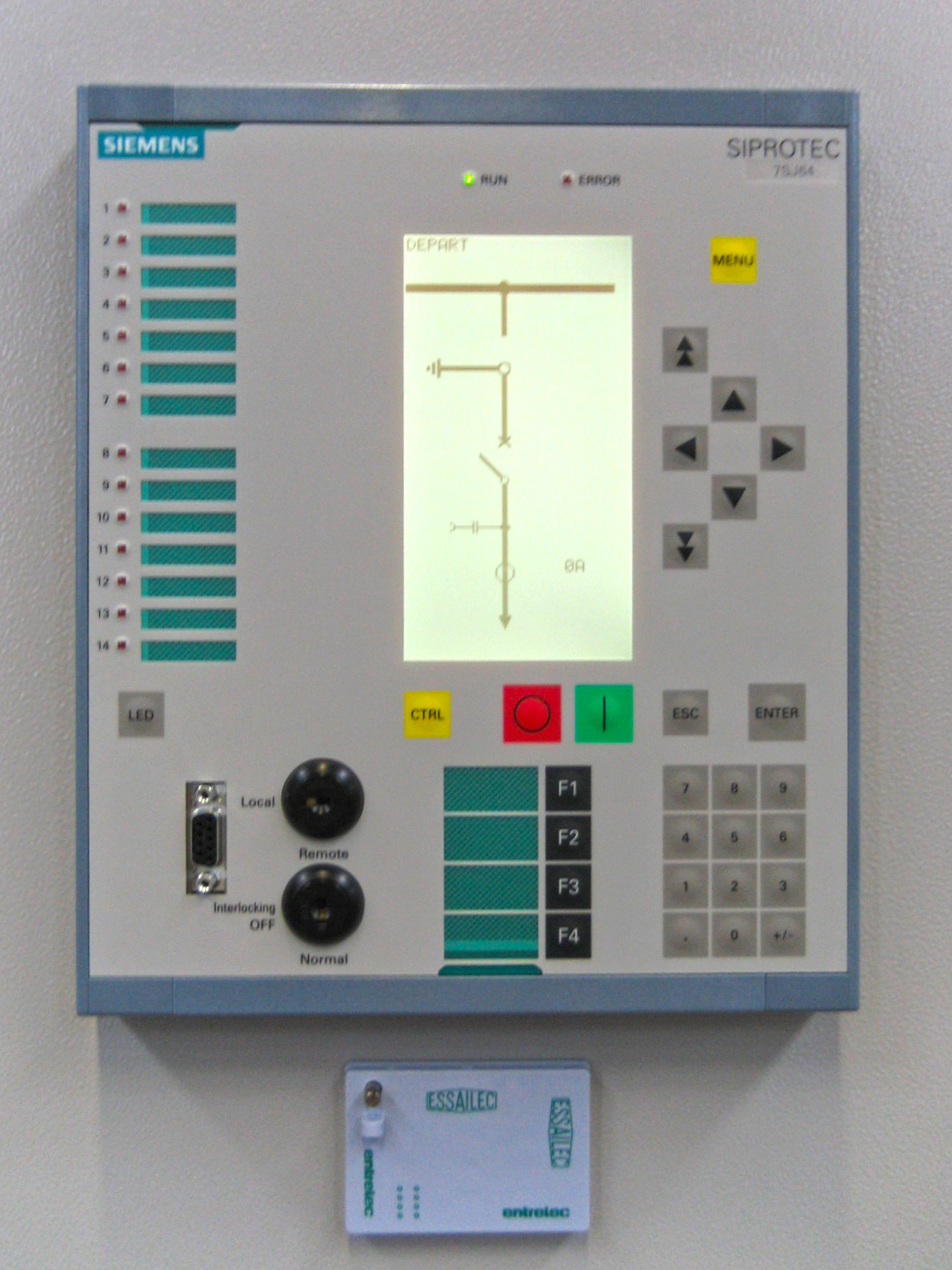
A multifunction digital protective relay typically installed at a substation to protect a distribution feeder

Power systems contain protective devices to prevent injury or damage during failures. The quintessential protective device is the fuse. When the current through a fuse exceeds a certain threshold, the fuse element melts, producing an arc across the resulting gap that is then extinguished, interrupting the circuit. Given that fuses can be built as the weak point of a system, fuses are ideal for protecting circuitry from damage. Fuses however have two problems: First, after they have functioned, fuses must be replaced as they cannot be reset. This can prove inconvenient if the fuse is at a remote site or a spare fuse is not on hand. And second, fuses are typically inadequate as the sole safety device in most power systems as they allow current flows well in excess of that that would prove lethal to a human or animal.

The first problem is resolved by the use of circuit breakers—devices that can be reset after they have broken current flow. In modern systems that use less than about 10 kW, miniature circuit breakers are typically used. These devices combine the mechanism that initiates the trip (by sensing excess current) as well as the mechanism that breaks the current flow in a single unit. Some miniature circuit breakers operate solely on the basis of electromagnetism. In these miniature circuit breakers, the current is run through a solenoid, and, in the event of excess current flow, the magnetic pull of the solenoid is sufficient to force open the circuit breaker's contacts (often indirectly through a tripping mechanism).

In higher powered applications, the protective relays that detect a fault and initiate a trip are separate from the circuit breaker. Early relays worked based upon electromagnetic principles similar to those mentioned in the previous paragraph, modern relays are application-specific computers that determine whether to trip based upon readings from the power system. Different relays will initiate trips depending upon different protection schemes. For example, an overcurrent relay might initiate a trip if the current on any phase exceeds a certain threshold whereas a set of differential relays might initiate a trip if the sum of currents between them indicates there may be current leaking to earth. The circuit breakers in higher powered applications are different too. Air is typically no longer sufficient to quench the arc that forms when the contacts are forced open so a variety of techniques are used. One of the most popular techniques is to keep the chamber enclosing the contacts flooded with sulfur hexafluoride (SF_{6})—a non-toxic gas with sound arc-quenching properties. Other techniques are discussed in the reference.

The second problem, the inadequacy of fuses to act as the sole safety device in most power systems, is probably best resolved by the use of residual-current devices (RCDs). In any properly functioning electrical appliance, the current flowing into the appliance on the active line should equal the current flowing out of the appliance on the neutral line. A residual current device works by monitoring the active and neutral lines and tripping the active line if it notices a difference. Residual current devices require a separate neutral line for each phase and to be able to trip within a time frame before harm occurs. This is typically not a problem in most residential applications where standard wiring provides an active and neutral line for each appliance (that is why your power plugs always have at least two tongs) and the voltages are relatively low however these issues limit the effectiveness of RCDs in other applications such as industry. Even with the installation of an RCD, exposure to electricity can still prove fatal.

=== SCADA systems ===
In large electric power systems, supervisory control and data acquisition (SCADA) is used for tasks such as switching on generators, controlling generator output and switching in or out system elements for maintenance. The first supervisory control systems implemented consisted of a panel of lamps and switches at a central console near the controlled plant. The lamps provided feedback on the state of the plant (the data acquisition function) and the switches allowed adjustments to the plant to be made (the supervisory control function). Today, SCADA systems are much more sophisticated and, due to advances in communication systems, the consoles controlling the plant no longer need to be near the plant itself. Instead, it is now common for plants to be controlled with equipment similar (if not identical) to a desktop computer. The ability to control such plants through computers has increased the need for security—there have already been reports of cyber-attacks on such systems causing significant disruptions to power systems.

== Power systems in practice ==
Despite their common components, power systems vary widely both with respect to their design and how they operate. This section introduces some common power system types and briefly explains their operation.

=== Residential power systems ===
Residential dwellings almost always take supply from the low voltage distribution lines or cables that run past the dwelling. These operate at voltages of between 110 and 260 volts (phase-to-earth) depending upon national standards. A few decades ago small dwellings would be fed a single phase using a dedicated two-core service cable (one core for the active phase and one core for the neutral return). The active line would then be run through a main isolating switch in the fuse box and then split into one or more circuits to feed lighting and appliances inside the house. By convention, the lighting and appliance circuits are kept separate so the failure of an appliance does not leave the dwelling's occupants in the dark. All circuits would be fused with an appropriate fuse based upon the wire size used for that circuit. Circuits would have both an active and neutral wire with both the lighting and power sockets being connected in parallel. Sockets would also be provided with a protective earth. This would be made available to appliances to connect to any metallic casing. If this casing were to become live, the theory is the connection to earth would cause an RCD or fuse to trip—thus preventing the future electrocution of an occupant handling the appliance. Earthing systems vary between regions, but in countries such as the United Kingdom and Australia both the protective earth and neutral line would be earthed together near the fuse box before the main isolating switch and the neutral earthed once again back at the distribution transformer.

There have been a number of minor changes over the years to practice of residential wiring. Some of the most significant ways modern residential power systems in developed countries tend to vary from older ones include:

- For convenience, miniature circuit breakers are now almost always used in the fuse box instead of fuses as these can easily be reset by occupants and, if of the thermomagnetic type, can respond more quickly to some types of fault.
- For safety reasons, RCDs are now often installed on appliance circuits and, increasingly, even on lighting circuits.
- Whereas residential air conditioners of the past might have been fed from a dedicated circuit attached to a single phase, larger centralised air conditioners that require three-phase power are now becoming common in some countries.
- Protective earths are now run with lighting circuits to allow for metallic lamp holders to be earthed.
- Increasingly residential power systems are incorporating microgenerators, most notably, photovoltaic cells.

=== Commercial power systems ===
Commercial power systems such as shopping centers or high-rise buildings are larger in scale than residential systems. Electrical designs for larger commercial systems are usually studied for load flow, short-circuit fault levels and voltage drop. The objectives of the studies are to assure proper equipment and conductor sizing, and to coordinate protective devices so that minimal disruption is caused when a fault is cleared. Large commercial installations will have an orderly system of sub-panels, separate from the main distribution board to allow for better system protection and more efficient electrical installation.

Typically one of the largest appliances connected to a commercial power system in hot climates is the HVAC unit, and ensuring this unit is adequately supplied is an important consideration in commercial power systems. Regulations for commercial establishments place other requirements on commercial systems that are not placed on residential systems. For example, in Australia, commercial systems must comply with AS 2293, the standard for emergency lighting, which requires emergency lighting be maintained for at least 90 minutes in the event of loss of mains supply. In the United States, the National Electrical Code requires commercial systems to be built with at least one 20 A sign outlet in order to light outdoor signage. Building code regulations may place special requirements on the electrical system for emergency lighting, evacuation, emergency power, smoke control and fire protection.

== Power system management ==
Power system management varies depending upon the power system. Residential power systems and even automotive electrical systems are often run-to-fail. In aviation, the power system uses redundancy to ensure availability. On the Boeing 747-400 any of the four engines can provide power and circuit breakers are checked as part of power-up (a tripped circuit breaker indicating a fault). Larger power systems require active management. In industrial plants or mining sites a single team might be responsible for fault management, augmentation and maintenance. Where as for the electric grid, management is divided amongst several specialised teams.

=== Fault management ===
Fault management involves monitoring the behaviour of the power system so as to identify and correct issues that affect the system's reliability. Fault management can be specific and reactive: for example, dispatching a team to restring conductor that has been brought down during a storm. Or, alternatively, can focus on systemic improvements: such as the installation of reclosers on sections of the system that are subject to frequent temporary disruptions (as might be caused by vegetation, lightning or wildlife).

=== Maintenance and augmentation ===
In addition to fault management, power systems may require maintenance or augmentation. As often it is neither economical nor practical for large parts of the system to be offline during this work, power systems are built with many switches. These switches allow the part of the system being worked on to be isolated while the rest of the system remains live. At high voltages, there are two switches of note: isolators and circuit breakers. Circuit breakers are load-breaking switches where as operating isolators under load would lead to unacceptable and dangerous arcing. In a typical planned outage, several circuit breakers are tripped to allow the isolators to be switched before the circuit breakers are again closed to reroute power around the isolated area. This allows work to be completed on the isolated area.

=== Frequency and voltage management ===
Beyond fault management and maintenance one of the main difficulties in power systems is that the active power consumed plus losses must equal the active power produced. If load is reduced while generation inputs remain constant the synchronous generators will spin faster and the system frequency will rise. The opposite occurs if load is increased. As such the system frequency must be actively managed primarily through switching on and off dispatchable loads and generation. Making sure the frequency is constant is usually the task of a system operator. Even with frequency maintained, the system operator can be kept occupied ensuring:

1. equipment or customers on the system are being supplied with the required voltage
2. reactive power transmission is minimised (leading to more efficient operation)
3. teams are dispatched and the system is switched to mitigate any faults
4. remote switching is undertaken to allow for system works

== See also ==
- Power system simulation
- Power system reduction
