= Benjamin Kroposki =

Benjamin Kroposki is an electrical engineer at the National Renewable Energy Laboratory in Golden, Colorado. He was named a Fellow of the Institute of Electrical and Electronics Engineers (IEEE) in 2014 for his work with renewable and distributed energy systems integration in the electric power system.
