= Vladimir Terzija =

Vladimir Terzija is an electrical engineer at the University of Newcastle Upon Tyne, England. He was named a Fellow of the Institute of Electrical and Electronics Engineers (IEEE) in 2016 for his contributions to power system protection.
