= Mean of a function =

Formula for the average value of a function over its domain

In calculus, and especially multivariable calculus, the mean of a function is loosely defined as the average value of the function over its domain.

== One-dimensional ==
In a one-dimensional domain, the mean $\bar{f}$ of a function f(x) over the interval [a, b] is defined by
$$\bar{f}=\frac{1}{b-a}\int_a^bf(x)\,dx.$$

This definition can be justified as follows. The average value $\bar{y}$ of finitely many numbers $y_1, y_2, \dots, y_n$ is defined by the property $n\bar{y} = y_1 + y_2 + \cdots + y_n$. In other words, $\bar{y}$ is the constant value which when added $n$ times equals the result of adding the $n$ terms $y_1, \dots, y_n$. By analogy, a defining property of the average value $\bar{f}$ of a function over the interval $[a,b]$ is that
$$\int_a^b\bar{f}\,dx = \int_a^bf(x)\,dx .$$
In other words, $\bar{f}$ is the constant value which when integrated over $[a,b]$ equals the result of integrating $f(x)$ over $[a,b]$. But the integral of a constant $\bar{f}$ is just
$$\int_a^b\bar{f}\,dx = \bar{f}x\bigr|_a^b = \bar{f}b - \bar{f}a = (b - a)\bar{f} .$$

=== Mean value theorem ===
The first mean value theorem for integration guarantees that if $f$ is a continuous function on $[a,b]$ then there exists a point $c \in (a, b)$ such that
$$\int_a^bf(x)\,dx = f(c)(b - a) .$$
That is, continuous functions have the property that their mean value $\bar{f}$ on a closed interval is actually achieved at some point of the interval: there exists a point $c$ for which $\bar{f} = f(c)$.

== Multi-dimensional ==
In several variables, the mean over a relatively compact domain U in a Euclidean space is defined by

$$\bar{f}=\frac{1}{\hbox{Vol}(U)}\int_U f \; dV$$

where $\hbox{Vol}(U)$ and $dV$ are, respectively, the domain volume and volume element (or generalizations thereof, e.g., volume form).

== Non-arithmetic ==
The above generalizes the arithmetic mean to functions. On the other hand, it is also possible to generalize the geometric mean to functions by:

$$\exp\left(\frac{1}{\hbox{Vol}(U)}\int_U \log f\right).$$

More generally, in measure theory and probability theory, either sort of mean plays an important role. In this context, Jensen's inequality places sharp estimates on the relationship between these two different notions of the mean of a function.

There is also a harmonic average of functions and a quadratic average (or root mean square) of functions.

== See also ==
- Mean
