= Lucien Gaulard =

French engineer (1850–1888)

- Born: 16 July 1850; Paris, France
- Died: 26 November 1888 (aged 38); Paris, France
- Occupation: Inventor

Lucien Gaulard (16 July 1850 – 26 November 1888) was a French engineer who invented devices for the transmission of alternating current electrical energy.

== Biography ==
Gaulard was born in Paris, France in 1850.

A power transformer developed by Gaulard of France and John Dixon Gibbs of England was demonstrated in London, and attracted the interest of Westinghouse. Gaulard and Gibbs first exhibited a device in London in 1881 and then sold the idea to the American company Westinghouse. They also exhibited the invention in Turin in 1884, where it was adopted for an electric lighting system. Many of the features of their design were adapted to the particular laws governing electrical distribution in the UK.

In 1882, 1884, and 1885 Gaulard and Gibbs applied for patents on their transformer; however, these were overturned due to actions initiated by Sebastian Ziani de Ferranti and others.

In 1885, William Stanley, Jr. built the first practical American transformer based on Gaulard and Gibbs's idea, the precursor of the modern transformer. Transformers were nothing new, but the Gaulard-Gibbs design was one of the first that could handle large amounts of power and promised to be easy to manufacture. Westinghouse imported a number of Gaulard-Gibbs transformers and a Siemens AC generator to begin experimenting with AC networks in Pittsburgh.

Gaulard died in an institution (Sainte-Anne Hospital) in Paris, and was said to have lost his reason due to the loss of the patents on his invention. Several months before his death, Gaulard appeared at the Elysee asking the concierge to conduct him to the president of France, for whom, he said, he had an urgent message. The message was "I am God and God does not wait". He has been described as an inventor whose ingenuity cost him not only his money, but reason and life as well. A tablet was erected to Gaulard at Lanzo Torinese.

== Patents ==
- U.S. patent 351,589 (U.S. patent RE11836)

== See also ==
- John Dixon Gibbs
- Inductor
- Alternating current
- George Westinghouse
- William Stanley
- The Current War
