= William Stanley Jr. =

American physicist (1858 - 1916)

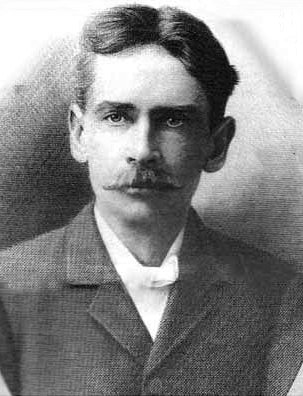
- Born: November 28, 1858; Brooklyn, New York City, U.S.
- Died: May 14, 1916 (aged 57); Great Barrington, Massachusetts, U.S.
- Education: Yale University (BA)
- Spouse: Lila Courtney (Wetmore) Stanley (m. 1884)
- Children: Harold Stanley
- Awards: IEEE Edison Medal (1912)
- Scientific career
- Fields: Electrical engineering
- Workplaces: General Electric

Signature
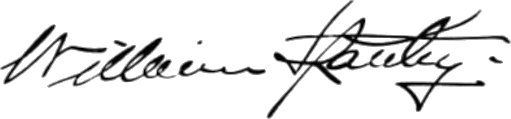

William Stanley Jr. (November 28, 1858 – May 14, 1916) was an American physicist born in Brooklyn, New York City. During his career, he obtained 129 patents covering a variety of electric devices. In 1913, he also patented an all-steel vacuum bottle, and formed the Stanley Bottle Company.

== Early life and education ==
Stanley was born November 28, 1858, in Brooklyn, New York, the son of William Stanley and Elizabeth A. Parsons Stanley. William Jr. attended Williston Seminary and attended Yale University class of 1881, but left in his first year before Christmas vacation. He would comment years later, “I am afraid there is a good deal of stuff taught in school that clogs instead of clears the brain.”

== Career ==
Stanley was as an electrician working with tele keys and fire alarms of an early manufacturer. In Philadelphia, Stanley designed one of the first electrical installations (at a Fifth Avenue store). Shortly thereafter, George Westinghouse hired Stanley as his chief engineer at his Pittsburgh factory.

In 1885, Stanley built the first practical alternating current transformer based on Lucien Gaulard and John Dixon Gibbs' prototype of 1881. This device was the precursor to the modern transformer. In December, under a new contract with Westinghouse, Stanley moved his operations to Great Barrington, Massachusetts.

In 1886, on March 20, Stanley demonstrated the first complete system of high voltage alternating current transmission, consisting of generators, transformers and high-voltage transmission lines. His system allowed the distribution of electrical power over wide areas. He used the system to light offices and stores along the main street of Great Barrington - the location of his West Avenue family home. Stanley's transformer design became a prototype for future transformers, and his AC distribution system formed the basis of modern electrical power distribution. His work in the electrification of Great Barrington's Main Street was named an IEEE Milestone.

Agreeing that the AC system had arrived, Westinghouse further tested the system in summer 1886 in Pittsburgh; it transmitted over a distance of 3 miles, and used an alternator designed by Stanley to replace the Siemens model, which regulated voltage poorly. Satisfied with the pilot system, Westinghouse began commercial production and shipped his company's first commercial alternator to Buffalo, New York, where a local utility placed it in service. Orders for 25 alternating-current plants followed within months.

In 1890, Stanley founded the Stanley Electric Manufacturing Company in Pittsfield, Massachusetts. In 1903 the General Electric Corporation purchased a controlling interest in the firm. The land on which the company once stood is now the site of the William Stanley Business Park of the Berkshires in Pittsfield.

=== Patents ===
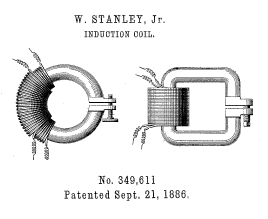
The practical coil circuits were the prototypes for the modern transformers. (U.S. patent 349,611)

William Stanley Jr. was granted 129 patents for a range of products and electrical devices. A selection of patents follow. Significant patents are in bold.

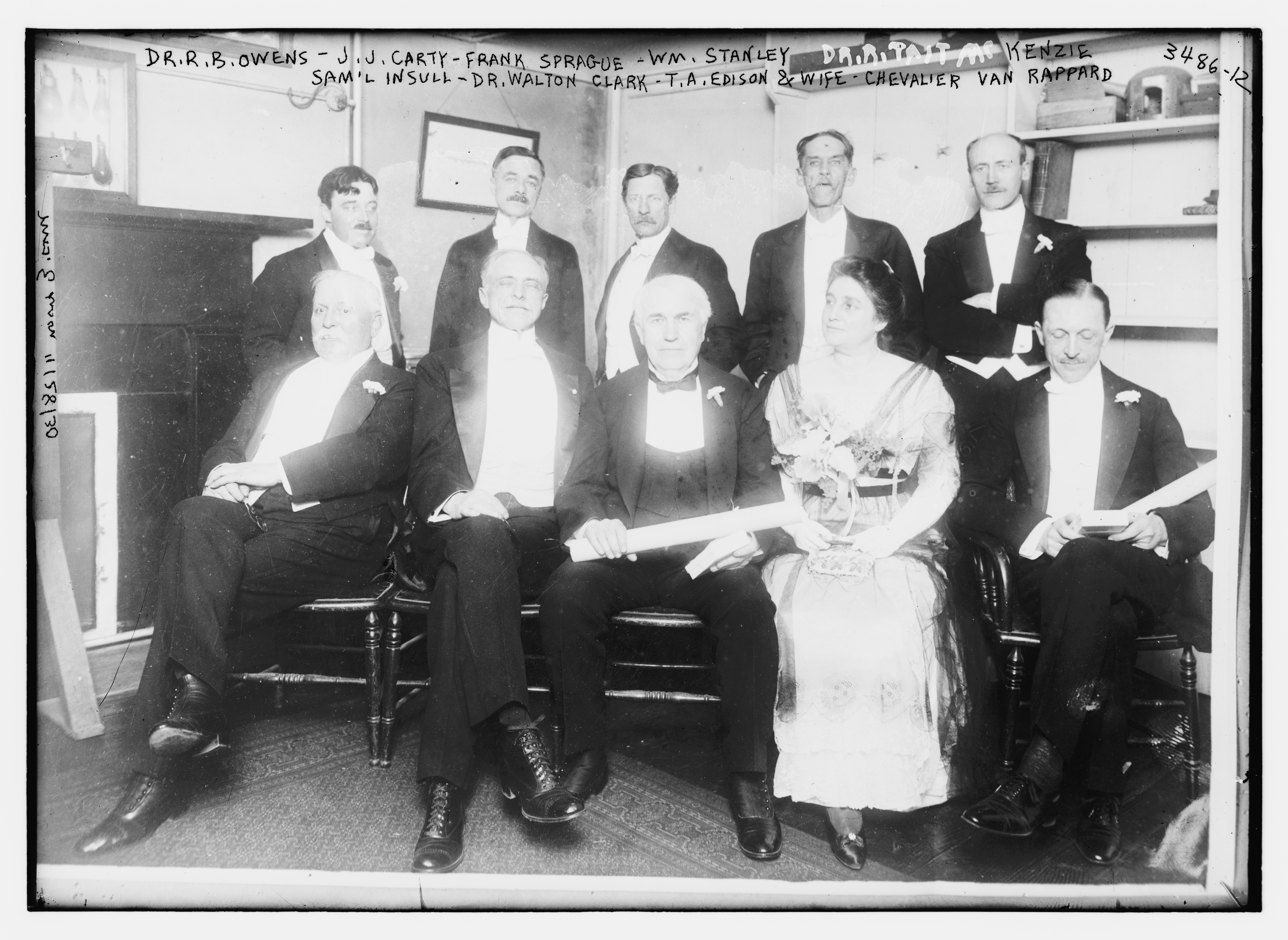
Stanley (second row, second from right) in Philadelphia on May 19, 1915, during the awarding of the Franklin Medal with Thomas Alva Edison

- U.S. patent 244,331, Circuit-closer for incandescent lamps
- U.S. patent 269,132, Electric lamp
- U.S. patent 316,302, Filament for incandescent electric lamps
- U.S. patent 322,496, Multiple incandescent electric lamp
- **U.S. patent 323,372, Carbon for incandescent lamps**
- U.S. patent 324,894, Socket for incandescent electric lamp
- U.S. patent 330,269, Holder for incandescent electric lamp
- U.S. patent 333,028, Globe for incandescent electric lamp
- **U.S. patent 349,611, Induction coil**
- U.S. patent 349,613, Automatic cut-out for electric-lighting circuits
- U.S. patent 349,614, Automatic cut-out for electric-lighting circuit
- **U.S. patent 363,559, Incandescent electric lamp**
- U.S. patent 333,564, System of electric lighting
- U.S. patent 387,117
- U.S. patent 428,575
- U.S. patent 508,188

== Personal life ==
William married to Lila Courtney (Wetmore) Stanley in 1884. In 1935, their son, Harold Stanley, went on to found the modern day financial firm of Morgan Stanley with J. P. Morgan's grandson, Henry Sturgis Morgan.

William Stanley Jr. died at his home in Great Barrington on May 14, 1916.

== See also ==
- Oliver B. Shallenberger
