= John Dixon Gibbs =

John Dixon Gibbs (14 July 1833–6 March 1912) was a British engineer and financier who, together with Lucien Gaulard, is often credited as the co-inventor of the AC step-down transformer. The transformer was first demonstrated in 1883 at London's Royal Aquarium. At the time the term "transformer" had not yet been invented, so instead it was referred to as a "secondary generator". Although he is usually credited equally with Gaulard, Gibb's role in the invention appears to have been more that of a financial backer and businessman.

He was one of the initial subscribers to the "National Company for Distribution of Electricity by Secondary Generators", registered on 11 May 1883. In March 1886, he attended that company`s third ordinary annual general meeting and delivered an address regarding the company`s business progress etc.

Although the underlying physics of the transformer, mainly Faraday's law of induction, had been known since the 1830s, transformers became viable only after the introduction of Gaulard and Gibbs's transformer design in 1883. The breakthrough was to build an iron transformer core which could act as a magnetic circuit. At the time, their invention was seen as overcomplicated since it contained a movable armature. It caught the attention of Sir Coutts Lindsay, who used it to power the Grosvenor Gallery, which was one of the first lighting systems in Britain powered by a central generating station. In 1885 Ottó Bláthy, Miksa Déri and Károly Zipernowsky secured a patent on a similar design, using laminated sheets of metal to reduce eddy currents.

Information on an exhibition of Gibbs and Gaulard's transformer in Turin, Italy in 1884 was published in 1885 and caught the attention of George Westinghouse. In the summer of 1885 Westinghouse bought the American rights for Gibbs and Gaulard's design and ordered that several transformers from Gibbs and Gaulard be purchased and shipped to his factory in Pittsburgh. Westinghouse then asked the engineer William Stanley, Jr. to design an electric lighting system using them. Stanley subsequently greatly improved on Gibbs and Gaulard's design and is often credited in their place. In July 1889 Gibbs was reported as being one of the four initial directors of the newly-registered British company "The Westinghouse Electric Co. Ltd." (George Westinghouse junior being one of the others).

John Dixon Gibbs had his work patented under German patent no. 28947, a patent also recognized in Great Britain. The patent was disputed by Sebastian Ziani de Ferranti. Following patent litigation, Gibbs and Gaulard lost the patent. Gibbs appealed the suit, taking the case all the way to the House of Lords, where he again lost. He was financially ruined in the process.
