= Frequency conversion =

Frequency conversion may refer to different processes affecting frequency of physical phenomena:

- A frequency changer, an electronic device that converts alternating current (AC) of one frequency to alternating current of another frequency
  - A variable-frequency drive, a type of frequency changer
- Frequency conversion in nonlinear optics may refer to various manipulations of the frequency of light
- A Heterodyne is used in signal electronics to convert frequencies
