= Mornsun =

Power supply company (e. 1998)

Mornsun Guangzhou Science & Technology Co., Ltd.
- Native name: 广州金升阳科技有限公司
- Industry: Power supply, Electronics
- Founded: July 1998
- Headquarters: Guangzhou
- Key people: George Yin (founder, CEO)
- Products: converters, chips
- Website: mornsun-power.com

Mornsun (Chinese: 金升阳, stylised as MORNSUN), also known as Mornsun Power, is a China-based power supply manufacturer with full name of Mornsun Guangzhou Science & Technology Co., Ltd. (广州金升阳科技有限公司). It was established by George Yin in 1998, and is headquartered in Guangzhou.

Mornsun focuses on the magnetic-electric isolation technology and its product applications, and specializes in making DC-to-DC converters and AC-to-DC converters. In addition to power supplies, it also produces chips.

== History ==
Mornsun was founded by George Yin in 1998 in Guangzhou. Since 2005, Relec Electronics Limited has become the distributor of Mornsun in the United Kingdom.

In October 2017, Mornsun and SE Spezial-Electronic GmbH launched a joint venture company Mornsun Power GmbH in Germany.

On May 1, 2024, the U.S. Treasury Department added Mornsun to the Specially Designated Nationals List, as part of the targeting of PRC entities supporting Russia’s defense industrial base.
