= Doubly fed electric machine =

Electric motor

A doubly fed electric machines, doubly fed induction generator (DFIG), or slip-ring generator is an electric motor or electric generator where both the field magnet windings and armature windings are separately connected to equipment outside the machine.

By feeding adjustable-frequency AC power to the field windings, the magnetic field can be made to rotate, allowing variation in motor or generator speed. This is useful, for instance, for generators used in wind turbines. Doubly fed electric machines are also used in variable-speed pumped-storage hydropower plants. Additionally, DFIG-based wind turbines offer the ability to control active and reactive power.

== Introduction ==
Doubly fed generator for wind turbine

Doubly fed electrical generators are similar to AC electrical generators, but have additional features which allow them to run at speeds slightly above or below their natural synchronous speed. This is useful for large variable speed wind turbines, because wind speed can change suddenly. When a gust of wind hits a wind turbine, the blades try to speed up, but a synchronous generator is locked to the speed of the power grid and cannot speed up. So large forces are developed in the hub, gearbox, and generator as the power grid pushes back. This causes wear and damage to the mechanism. If the turbine is allowed to speed up immediately when hit by a wind gust, the stresses are lower with the power from the wind gust still being converted to useful electricity.

One approach to allowing wind turbine speed to vary is to accept whatever frequency the generator produces, convert it to DC, and then convert it to AC at the desired output frequency using an inverter. This is common for small house and farm wind turbines. But the inverters required for megawatt-scale wind turbines are large and expensive.

Doubly fed generators are another solution to this problem. Instead of the usual field winding fed with DC, and an armature winding where the generated electricity comes out, there are two three-phase windings, one stationary and one rotating, both separately connected to equipment outside the generator. Thus, the term doubly fed is used for this kind of machine.

One winding is directly connected to the output, and produces three-phase AC power at the desired grid frequency. The other winding (traditionally called the field, but here both windings can be outputs) is connected to three-phase AC power at variable frequency. This input power is adjusted in frequency and phase to compensate for changes in speed of the turbine.

Adjusting the frequency and phase requires an AC to DC to AC converter. This is usually constructed from very large IGBT semiconductors. The converter is bidirectional, and can pass power in either direction. Power can flow from this winding as well as from the output winding.

== History ==
With its origins in wound rotor induction motors with multiphase winding sets on the rotor and stator, respectively, which were invented by Nikola Tesla in 1888, the rotor winding set of the doubly fed electric machine is connected to a selection of resistors via multiphase slip rings for starting. However, the slip power was lost in the resistors. Thus means to increase the efficiency in variable speed operation by recovering the slip power were developed. In Krämer (or Kraemer) drives the rotor was connected to an AC and DC machine set that fed a DC machine connected to the shaft of the slip ring machine. Thus the slip power was returned as mechanical power and the drive could be controlled by the excitation currents of the DC machines. The drawback of the Krämer drive is that the machines need to be overdimensioned in order to cope with the extra circulating power. This drawback was corrected in the Scherbius drive where the slip power is fed back to the AC grid by motor generator sets.

The rotating machinery used for the rotor supply was heavy and expensive. Improvement in this respect was the static Scherbius drive where the rotor was connected to a rectifier-inverter set constructed first by mercury arc-based devices and later on with semiconductor diodes and thyristors. In the schemes using a rectifier the power flow was possible only out of the rotor because of the uncontrolled rectifier. Moreover, only sub-synchronous operation as a motor was possible.

Another concept using static frequency converter had a cycloconverter connected between the rotor and the AC grid. The cycloconverter can feed power in both directions and thus the machine can be run both sub- and oversynchronous speeds. Large cycloconverter-controlled, doubly fed machines have been used to run single phase generators feeding 16 2/3 Hz railway grid in Europe. Cycloconverter powered machines can also run the turbines in pumped storage plants.

Today the frequency changer used in applications up to few tens of megawatts consists of two back to back connected IGBT inverters.

Several brushless concepts have also been developed in order to get rid of the slip rings that require maintenance.

== Doubly fed induction generator ==
Doubly fed induction generator (DFIG), a generating principle widely used in wind turbines. It is based on an induction generator with a multiphase wound rotor and a multiphase slip ring assembly with brushes for access to the rotor windings. It is possible to avoid the multiphase slip ring assembly, but there are problems with efficiency, cost and size. A better alternative is a brushless wound-rotor doubly fed electric machine.

Principle of a double-fed induction generator connected to a wind turbine

The principle of the DFIG is that stator windings are connected to the grid and rotor winding are connected to the converter via slip rings and back-to-back voltage source converter that controls both the rotor and the grid currents. Thus rotor frequency can freely differ from the grid frequency (50 or 60 Hz). By using the converter to control the rotor currents, it is possible to adjust the active and reactive power fed to the grid from the stator independently of the generator's turning speed. The control principle used is either the two-axis current vector control or direct torque control (DTC). DTC has turned out to have better stability than current vector control especially when high reactive currents are required from the generator.

The doubly fed generator rotors are typically wound with 2 to 3 times the number of turns of the stator. This means that the rotor voltages will be higher and currents respectively lower. Thus in the typical ±30% operational speed range around the synchronous speed, the rated current of the converter is accordingly lower which leads to a lower cost of the converter. The drawback is that controlled operation outside the operational speed range is impossible because of the higher than rated rotor voltage. Further, the voltage transients due to the grid disturbances (three- and two-phase voltage dips, especially) will also be magnified. In order to prevent high rotor voltages (and high currents resulting from these voltages) from destroying the insulated-gate bipolar transistors and diodes of the converter, a protection circuit (called crowbar) is used.

The crowbar will short-circuit the rotor windings through a small resistance when excessive currents or voltages are detected. In order to be able to continue the operation as quickly as possible an active crowbar has to be used. The active crowbar can remove the rotor short in a controlled way and thus the rotor side converter can be started only after 20–60 ms from the start of the grid disturbance when the remaining voltage stays above 15% of the nominal voltage. Thus, it is possible to generate reactive current to the grid during the rest of the voltage dip and in this way help the grid to recover from the fault. For zero-voltage ride-through, it is common to wait until the dip ends because it is otherwise not possible to know the phase angle where the reactive current should be injected.

As a summary, a doubly fed induction machine is a wound-rotor doubly fed electric machine and has several advantages over a conventional induction machine in wind power applications. First, as the rotor circuit is controlled by a power electronics converter, the induction generator is able to both import and export reactive power. This has important consequences for power system stability and allows the machine to support the grid during severe voltage disturbances (low-voltage ride-through; LVRT). Second, the control of the rotor voltages and currents enables the induction machine to remain synchronized with the grid while the wind turbine speed varies. A variable speed wind turbine utilizes the available wind resource more efficiently than a fixed speed wind turbine, especially during light wind conditions. Third, the cost of the converter is low when compared with other variable speed solutions because only a fraction of the mechanical power, typically 25–30%, is fed to the grid through the converter, the rest being fed to grid directly from the stator. The efficiency of the DFIG is very good for the same reason.

== See also ==
- Variable-frequency transformer
