= Wound rotor motor =

Type of induction motor

Schematic symbol of a slip ring motor

A wound-rotor motor, also known as slip ring-rotor motor, is a type of induction motor where the rotor windings are connected through slip rings to external resistance. Adjusting the resistance allows control of the speed/torque characteristic of the motor. Wound-rotor motors can be started with low inrush current, by inserting high resistance into the rotor circuit; as the motor accelerates, the resistance can be decreased.

Compared to a squirrel-cage rotor, the rotor of the slip ring motor has more winding turns; the induced voltage is then higher, and the current lower, than for a squirrel-cage rotor. During the start-up a typical rotor has 3 poles connected to the slip ring. Each pole is wired in series with a variable power resistor. When the motor reaches full speed the rotor poles are switched to short circuit. During start-up the resistors reduce the field strength at the stator. As a result, the inrush current is reduced. Another important advantage over squirrel-cage motors is higher starting torque and smooth operation due to variable speed.

The speed and torque characteristics of a wound-rotor motor can be adjusted by changing the external resistance, unlike a squirrel cage motor which has a fixed characteristic. This is useful for speed control of the motor.

A wound-rotor motor can be used in several forms of adjustable-speed drive. Common applications include hoists, elevators, and conveyor systems. Also, the travel mechanism of gantry cranes or overhead cranes also used this type of motor, because it has both adjustable speed and high torque. Many gantry cranes and portal cranes used in ship yards used this motor for smooth handling of heavy containers, ship handling, ship part handling, because it is very tolerant with overloads and can precisely handle heavy loads, and also its speed is not affected by load. Certain types of variable-speed drives recover slip-frequency power from the rotor circuit and feed it back to the supply, allowing wide speed range with high energy efficiency. Doubly-fed electric machines use the slip rings to supply external power to the rotor circuit, allowing wide-range speed control. Today speed control by use of slip ring motor is mostly superseded by induction motors with variable-frequency drives.

== Advantages ==
- High starting torque with relatively low inrush current.
- Strong running torque and good speed regulation.
- Wide speed-control range without complex power electronics.
- Stable behaviour under load and good overload tolerance.
- Effective efficiency at rated speed.
- Suitable for certain gearless elevator systems when built with higher pole counts, though at the cost of size and weight.
- Can run cooler than squirrel cage motors due to the absence of enclosure.

== Disadvantages ==
- Slip rings require regular maintenance and add mechanical complexity.
- More mechanical and acoustic noise, especially during start-up under load.
- Generally lower efficiency than squirrel-cage motors.
- Larger physical size for a given power rating.
- Not fully enclosed, increasing exposure to moisture and dust and limiting use in hazardous or damp environments.
- Often displaced in modern applications by induction motors with variable-frequency drives or permanent-magnet synchronous motors.

== See also ==
- Doubly Fed Induction Generator - use of similar motors to allow wind turbines and other sources to have a variable input speed relative to the grid supply, allowing for Black start operations
- Scherbius Drive
