= Ahmed Rubaai =

American electrical engineer

Ahmed Rubaai is an electrical engineer at Howard University in Washington, DC. He was named a Fellow of the Institute of Electrical and Electronics Engineers (IEEE) in 2015 for his contributions to the development of high-performance controls for motor drives.
