= Kashem Muttaqi =

Bangladeshi-born Australian academic

- Born: Bangladesh
- Occupation: Professor
- Known for: Fellow of the Institute of Electrical and Electronics Engineers

Kashem Muttaqi is a Bangladeshi-born Australian academic who is a Distinguished Professor of electrical engineering at the University of Wollongong (UOW). He is recognized for his contributions to the fields of power and energy systems, particularly in the integration of renewable and distributed energy resources. Muttaqi is the Director of the Australian Research Council Industrial Transformation Training Centre in Energy Technologies for Future Grids (ARC Future Grids ITTC) and the Director of the Australian Power and Energy Research Institute (APERI) at UOW. He is an IEEE Fellow.

Muttaqi's research is focused on practical applications of electrical engineering, with an emphasis on addressing modern energy challenges. He has authored or co-authored over 500 papers in international journals and conference proceedings, covering topics such as power converters, electric vehicles, and smart grids. His work has been instrumental in the development of sophisticated models and control strategies for integrating distributed generation into existing power systems.

Muttaqi serves as the Editor-in-Chief of the IEEE Transactions on Industry Applications and is an Executive Board Member of the IEEE Industry Applications Society.
