= List of Enigma machine simulators =

List of Enigma machine simulators lists software implementations of the Enigma machine, a rotor cypher device that was invented by German engineer Arthur Scherbius at the end of World War I and used in the early to mid-20th century to protect commercial, diplomatic, and military communication.

== List of Enigma simulators ==
Name	Platform	Machine types	Uhr	UKW-D
EnigmaZone	Windows	Enigma I, M3, M4, plus German and English decryption tool	No	No
enKor's CryptoMuseum	C#	Any Enigma - fully configurable Rotors, Plugboard and Reflector. Sample models: German Railway (Rocket), Swiss K	No	Yes
Web Encryptor - The Online Encrypter	React App	Enigma I, M3 (Army/Navy), M4 (Army/Navy), Railway, Tirpitz, Zahlwerk (Default/G-260/G-312), Swiss-K (Air Force/Commercial)	No	Yes
Franklin Heath Enigma Simulator	Android	K Railway, Kriegsmarine M3, M4	No	No
EnigmAndroid	Android	Wehrmacht I, Kriegsmarine M3, M4, Abwehr G31, G312, G260, D, K, Swiss-K, KD, R, T	No	No
Andy Carlson Enigma Applet (Standalone Version)	Java	Kriegsmarine M3, M4	No	No
Minarke (Minarke Is Not A Real Kriegsmarine Enigma)	C/Posix/CLI (MacOS, Linux, UNIX, etc.)	Wehrmacht, Kriegsmarine, M3, M4	No	No
Russell Schwager Enigma Simulator	Java	Kriegsmarine M3	No	No
Lucas Santos' Enigma Simulator	Javascript	Wehrmacht I	No	No
PA3DBJ G-312 Enigma Simulator	Javascript	G312 Abwehr	No	No
Daniel Palloks Universal Enigma	Javascript	I (Wehrmacht), M3 (Kriegsmarine), M4 (Shark), D (commercial), K (commercial), Swiss-K, KD (Sweden), N (Norenigma), R (Railway), S (Sondermaschine), T (Tirpitz/Japan), A28/G31 (Zählwerk), G-111 (Hungary/Munich), G-260 (Abwehr/Argentina), G-312 (Abwehr/Bletchley Park), G-401 ("Group II")	Yes	Yes
Universal Enigma Machine Simulator	Javascript	D, I, Norway, M3, M4, Zählwerk, G, G-111, G-260, G-312, K, Swiss-K, KD, Railway, T	Yes	Yes
Virtual Enigma 3D	JavaScript	Wehrmacht, Kriegsmarine M4	No	No
Terry Long Enigma Simulator	MacOS	Kriegsmarine M3	No	No
Paul Reuvers Enigma Simulator for RISC OS	RISC OS	Kriegsmarine M3, M4, G-312 Abwehr	No	No
Enigma Windows Simulator	Windows	Wehrmacht, Luftwaffe	No	No
Dirk Rijmenants Enigma Simulator v7.0	Windows	Wehrmacht, Kriegsmarine M3, M4	No	No
Frode Weierud Enigma Simulators	Windows	Abwehr, Kriegsmarine M3, M4, Railway	No	No
Alexander Pukall Enigma Simulator	Windows	Wehrmacht, Luftwaffe	No	No
CrypTool 2 — Enigma component and cryptanalysis	Windows	A/B/D (commercial), Abwehr, Reichsbahn, Swiss-K, Enigma M3, Enigma M4	No	No
Enigma Python — Enigma Python API by Denis Maggiorotto	Python/Multiplatform	B (Sweden, s/n: A-133), D (commercial), Z (Z30 Mark I), I, I Norway, I Sondermaschine, M3, M4, K (commercial), K Swiss, T (Tirpitz)	No	No
Enigma MicroPython — Enigma Python API by Denis Maggiorotto	MicroPython/Multiplatform	Mirrors Enigma Python API by Denis Maggiorotto implementations	No	No
Enigma TUI — Enigma Terminal User Interface by Denis Maggiorotto	Python/Multiplatform	M3, M4	No	No
Marcos Velasco - MV Enigma Simulator	Windows	Enigma M3	No	No
