= Predictive control of switching power converters =

Feedback control system

Predictive controllers rely on optimum control systems theory and aim to solve a cost function minimization problem. Predictive controllers are relatively easy to numerically implement but electronic power converters are non-linear time-varying dynamic systems, so a different approach to predictive must be taken.

== Principles of non-linear predictive optimum control ==
The first step to designing a predictive controller is to derive a detailed direct dynamic model (including non-linearities) of the switching power converter. This model must contain enough detail of the converter dynamics to allow, from initial conditions, a forecast in real time and with negligible error, of the future behavior of the converter.

Sliding mode control of switching power converters chooses a vector to reach sliding mode as fast as possible (high switching frequency).

It would be better to choose a vector to ensure zero error at the end of the sampling period Δt.To find such a vector, a previous calculation can be made (prediction);

The converter has a finite number of vectors (states) and is usually non-linear: one way is to try all vectors to find the one that minimizes the control errors, prior to the application of that vector to the converter.

- Direct dynamics model-based predictive control (DDMBPC)

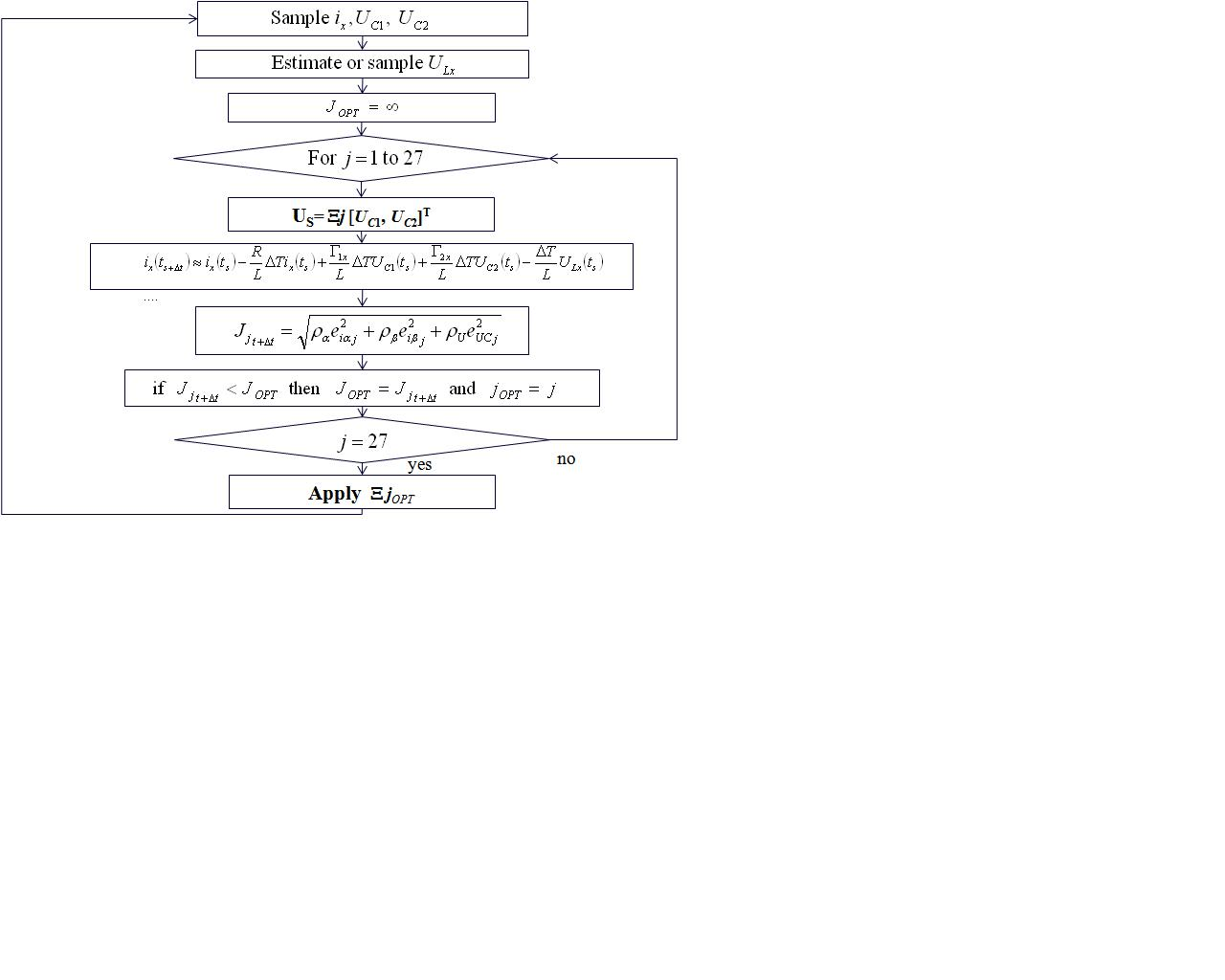
Direct Dynamics Predictive Control of Switching Power Converters

- Inverse dynamics optimum predictive control (IDOPC)

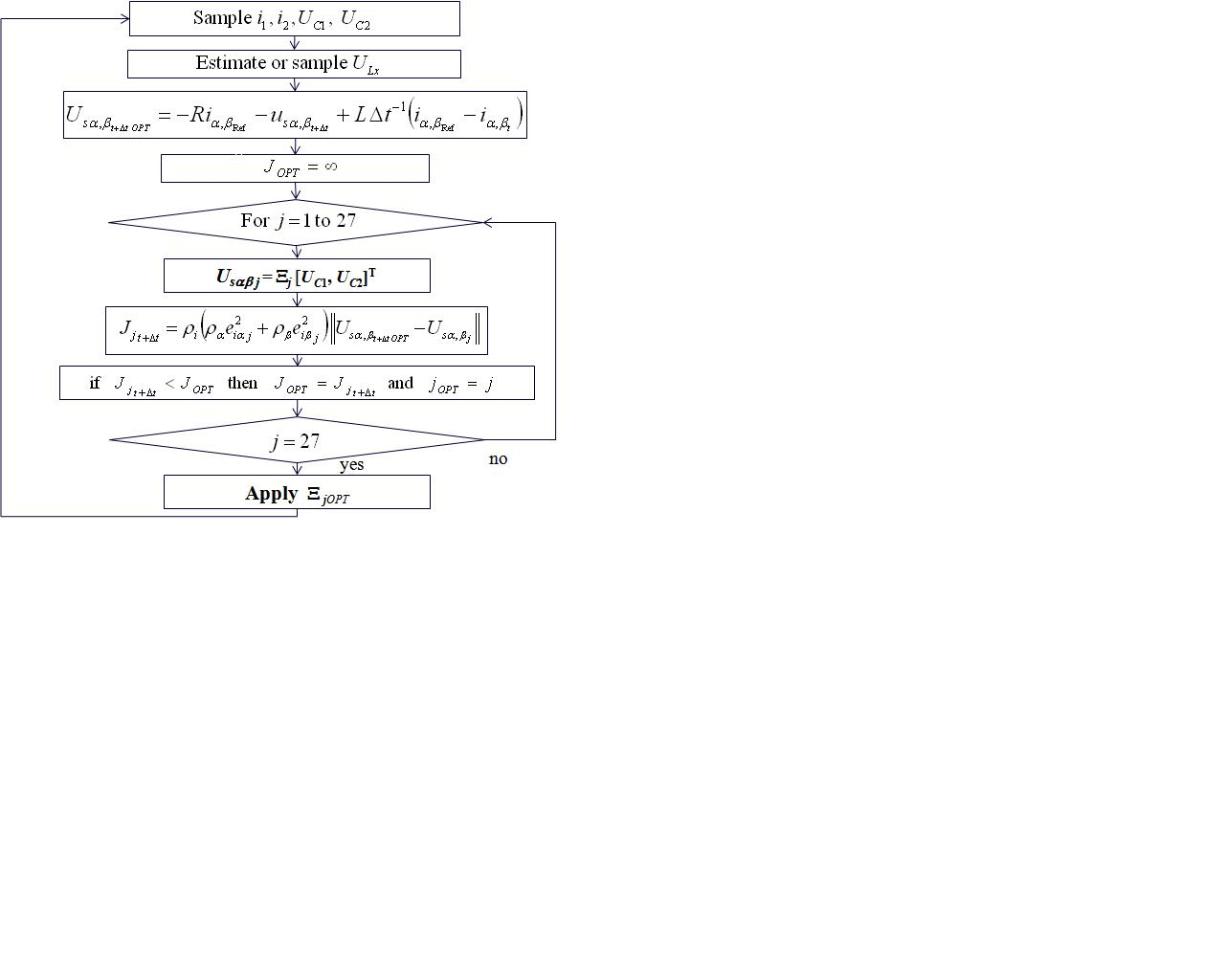
Inverse Dynamics Predictive Control of Switching Power Converters
