= Field magnet =

Magnet used to produce a magnetic field in a device

Field magnet refers to a magnet used to produce a magnetic field in a device. It may be a permanent magnet or an electromagnet. When the field magnet is an electromagnet, it is referred to as a field coil.

Although the term usually refers to magnets used in motors and generators, it may refer to magnets used in any of the following devices:

- Alternator
- Cathode ray tube
- Dynamo
- Electric motor
- Electrical generator
- Fusion reactor
- Loudspeaker
- Maglev trains
- Magnetic Separator
- Magneto
- Mass spectrometer
- Metal detector
- MRI scanner
- Particle accelerator
- Read/write head
- Relay
- Solenoid
- Stepping switch
- Tape head

== See also ==
- Rotor (electric)
- Stator
