= Scherbius Drive =

The Static Scherbius Drive provides the speed control of a wound rotor motor below synchronous speed. The portion of rotor AC power is converted into DC by a diode bridge. This motor drive has the ability of flow the power both in the positive as well as the negative direction of the injected voltage.

The Scherbius Drive is an electrical drive system invented by Arthur Scherbius, a German engineer known for his work in electrical engineering and cryptography (he also invented the Enigma machine). This drive system is primarily associated with controlling the speed of electric motors, particularly asynchronous (induction) motors. It is closely related to the static Kramer drive.

== Key Features ==
=== Slip Power Recovery ===
The drive enables the recovery and reuse of slip power from the rotor circuit of a wound-rotor induction motor. Instead of wasting the slip power as heat, it redirects it back to the power supply or another part of the system, improving overall efficiency.

=== Use of Rotary Converters ===
In its original design, Scherbius Drive used rotary converters (essentially motor-generator sets) to modulate the slip power. Modern implementations often replace rotary converters with solid-state electronics like inverters.

=== Variable Speed Control ===
By managing the slip power, the Scherbius Drive allows for speed control of the motor. This makes it particularly useful in applications requiring variable-speed operation, such as cranes, wind turbines, and pumps.

=== Advantages ===
- Improved efficiency due to slip power recovery.
- Smooth and reliable speed control.
- Suitable for high-power industrial applications.

=== Modern Evolution ===
Modern systems inspired by the Scherbius Drive concept now use advanced power electronics, such as static Scherbius drives, which incorporate converters and inverters to perform the same function with higher efficiency and flexibility.
