= Quadrature booster =

Specialised type of power transformer

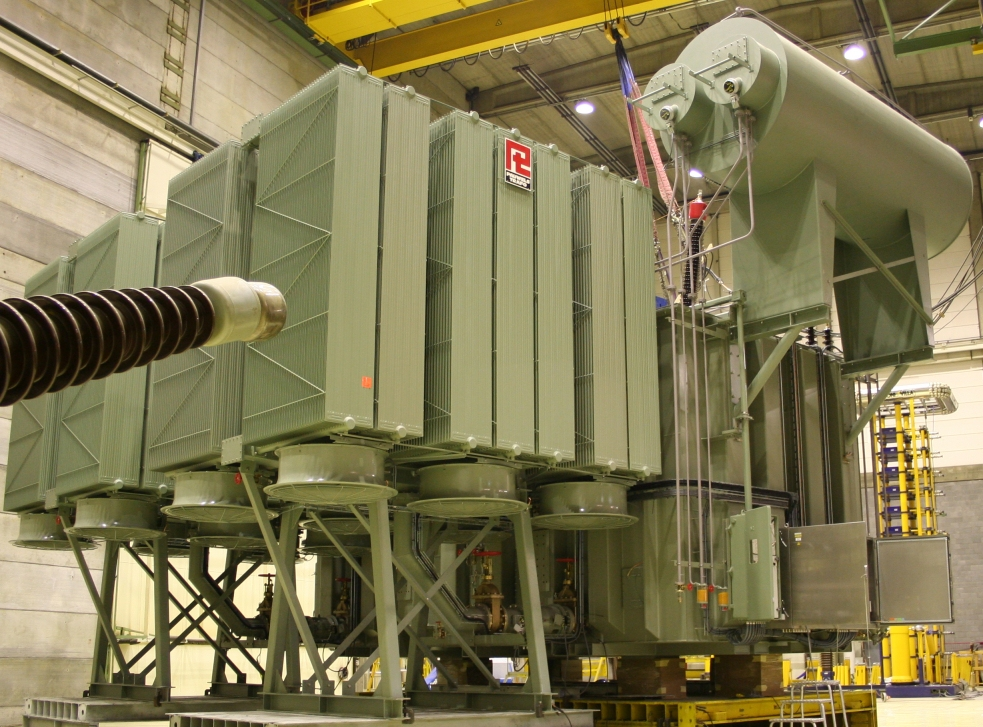
400 MVA 220/155 kV phase-shifting transformer.

A phase angle regulating transformer, phase angle regulator (PAR, American usage), phase-shifting transformer, phase shifter (American usage), or quadrature booster (quad booster, British usage), is a specialised form of transformer used to control the flow of real power on three-phase electric transmission networks.

For an alternating current transmission line, power flow through the line is proportional to the sine of the difference in the phase angle of the voltage between the transmitting end and the receiving end of the line. Where parallel circuits with different capacities exist between two points in a transmission grid (for example, an overhead line and an underground cable), direct manipulation of the phase angle allows control of the division of power flow between the paths, preventing overload. Quadrature boosters thus provide a means of relieving overloads on heavily laden circuits and re-routing power via more favorable paths.

Alternately, where an interchange partner is intentionally causing significant "inadvertent energy" to flow through an unwilling interchange partner's system, the unwilling partner may threaten to install a phase shifter to prevent such "inadvertent energy", with the unwilling partner's tactical objective being the improvement of its own system's stability at the expense of the other system's stability. As power system stability—hence reliability—is really a regional or national strategic objective, the threat to install a phase shifter is usually sufficient to cause the offending system to implement the required changes to its own system to greatly reduce or eliminate the "inadvertent energy" flowing through the offended system.

The capital cost of a quadrature booster can be high: as much as four to six million GBP (6–9 million USD) for a unit rated over 2 GVA. However, the utility to transmission system operators in flexibility and speed of operation, and, more particularly, facilitating economic dispatch of generation, can soon recover the cost of ownership.

== Method of operation ==
Simplified circuit diagram of a three-phase quadrature booster. Arrows shown on shunt transformer secondary windings are movable taps; the windings have floating ends shown, and grounded centre taps (not shown).

Phase-shifters affect the phase of their electrical output by combining the input with a comparable voltage at quadrature phase (90°, or multiplication by j). The phasor sum thus bears a new phase angle, and it is this induced phase angle that affects the flow of power through specified circuits.

A phase-shifter typically consists of two separate transformers: a shunt unit and a series unit. The shunt unit has its windings connected across the phases, so it observes voltages shifted by 90° with respect to the supply. The shunt output is then input to the series unit, which, because its secondary winding is in series with the main circuit, adds the phase-shifted component. The overall output voltage is hence the vector sum of the supply voltage and the 90° quadrature component.

Tap connections on the shunt unit allow the magnitude of the quadrature component to be controlled, and thus the magnitude of the phase shift across the quadrature booster. The flow on the circuit containing the quadrature booster may be increased (boost tapping) or reduced (buck tapping). Subject to system conditions, the flow may even be bucked enough to completely reverse from its neutral-tap direction.

== Illustration of effect ==
The one-line diagram below shows the effect of tapping a quadrature booster on a notional 100 MW generator-load system with two parallel transmission lines, one of which features a quadrature booster (shaded grey) with a tap range of 1 to 19.

In the left image, the quadrature booster is at its centre tap position of 10 and has a phase angle of 0°. It thus does not affect the power flow through its circuit and both lines are equally loaded at 50 MW. The right image shows the same network with the quadrature booster tapped down so as to buck the power flow. The resulting negative phase angle has diverted 23 MW of loading onto the parallel circuit, while the total load supplied is unchanged at 100 MW. (Note that the values used here are hypothetical; the actual phase angle and transfer in load would depend upon the parameters of the quadrature booster and the transmission lines.)

Effect of tapping a quadrature booster

Most quadrature booster installations seek the opposite effect: equalizing power on lines where naturally one would be heavily loaded and the other lightly loaded.

== Installed facilities ==
The power lines connecting Northern and Southern Germany are insufficient to transfer the power produced by the wind power plants located in the North Sea. Therefore, energy flows through the Czech transmission system, causing heavy loads on the Czech network and endangering secure network operation. The Czech transmission network operator ČEPS put a barrier system with two phase shifting transformers into operation in the Hradec substation on January 17, 2017. The total costs for the plant were around €75 million. The installation of the phase shifting transformers was necessary in order to regulate and control the flow of green electricity from Germany. The German transmission system operator 50 Hertz put two phase-shifting transformers into operation in the Röhrsdorf substation in January 2018. The Röhrsdorf and Hradec substations are connected via two 400 kV lines.

== See also ==
- Induction regulator
- Variable-frequency transformer
