= Half bridge =

Half-Bridge can refer to:

- A single-direction configuration of an H-Bridge motor controller
- A form of DC to DC converter switched-mode power supply.
- One of a pair of devices that connect to perform the Bridging (networking) function of a computer network
