= Cascade converter =

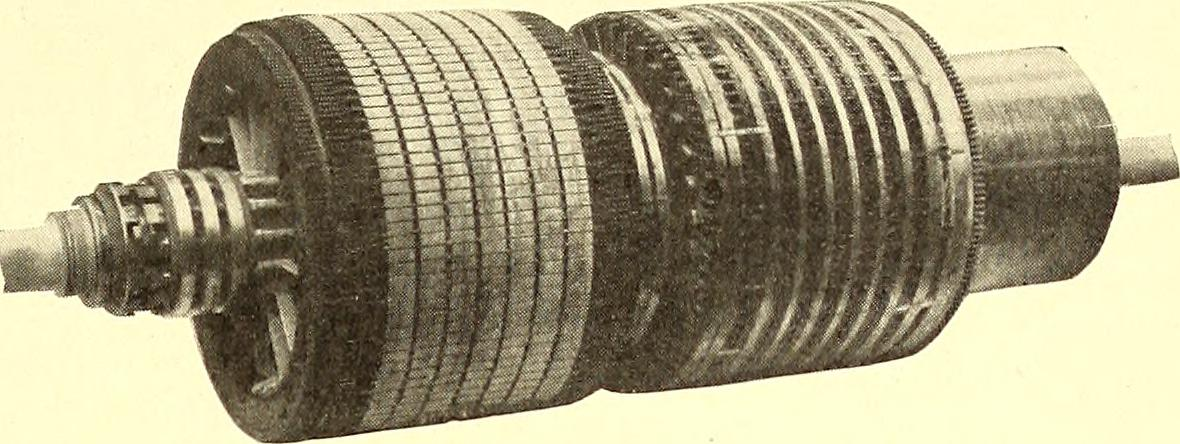

A cascade converter is a type of motor-generator which was patented in 1902 by J. L. la Cour and O. S. Bragstad.

It consists of an induction motor driving a dynamo through a shaft. In addition, the rotor of the induction motor is electrically connected to the armature of the dynamo.

When the machine is running, half the power is transmitted mechanically through the shaft while the other half is transmitted electrically.

The advantage of this arrangement is that the machine can be smaller than a conventional motor-generator of the same power.

The British manufacturing rights for the cascade converter were held by Bruce Peebles & Co. Ltd. of Edinburgh.

== Sources ==
- The Electrical Year Book 1937, published by Emmott and Company Limited, Manchester, England, pp 105-106

== See also ==
- Rotary converter
- Rotary phase converter
