= Motor drive =

Piece of machine equipment

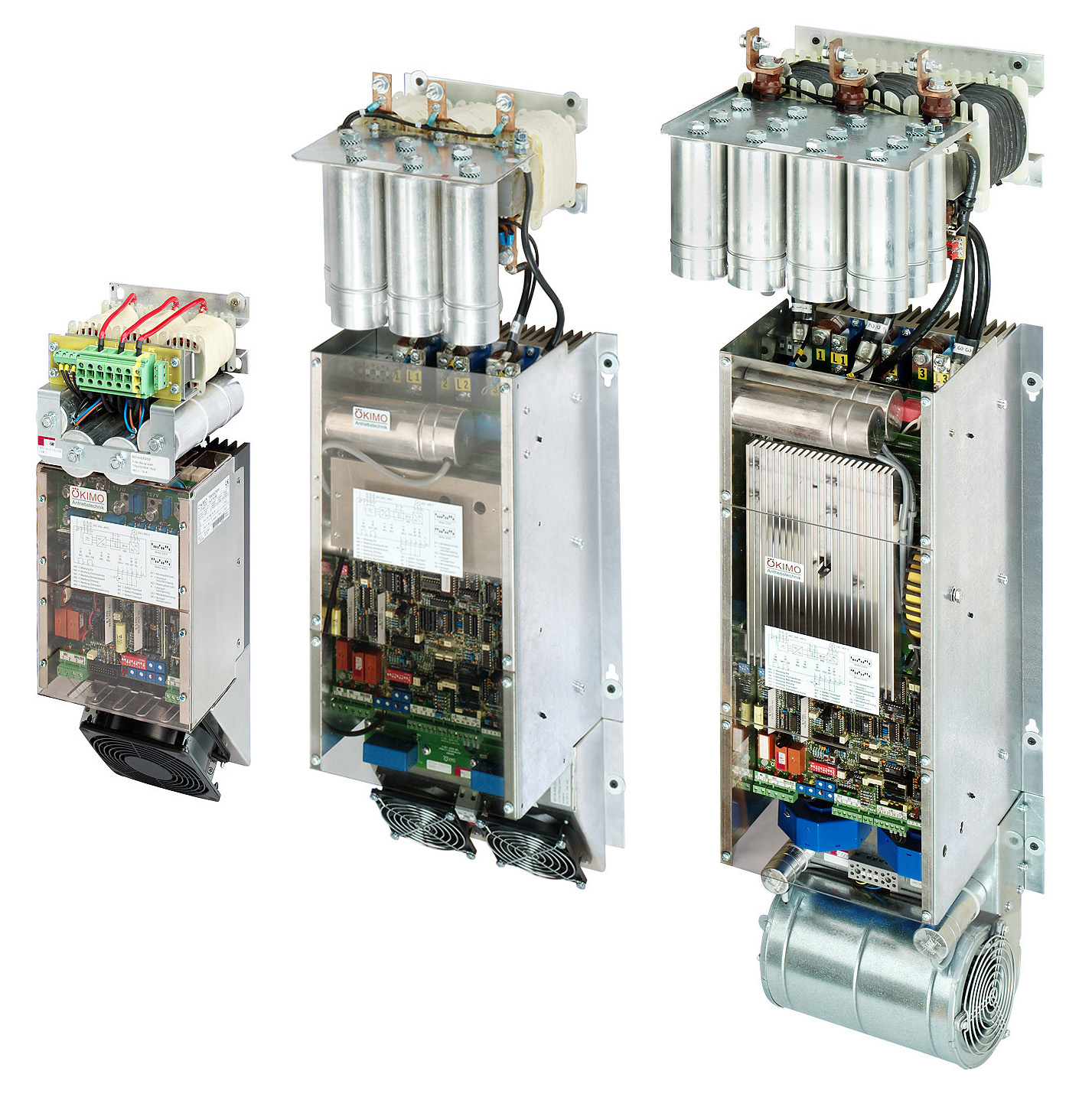
Line regenerative variable-frequency drives, showing capacitors (top cylinders) and inductors attached which filter the regenerated power

Motor drive is an electrical system that includes a motor. An adjustable-speed motor drive is a motor drive that has multiple operating speeds, while a variable-speed motor drive is continuously variable in speed. If the motor is generating electrical energy rather than consuming it, the motor drive could be called a generator drive, but it is often still referred to as a motor drive.

A variable-frequency drive (VFD) or variable-speed drive (VSD) describes the electronic portion of the system that controls the speed of the motor. More generally, the term drive, describes equipment used to control the speed of machinery. Many industrial processes such as assembly lines must operate at different speeds for different products. Where process conditions demand adjustment of flow from a pump or fan, varying the speed of the drive may save energy compared with other techniques for flow control.

Where speeds may be selected from several different pre-set ranges, usually the drive is said to be adjustable speed. If the output speed can be changed without steps over a range, the drive is usually referred to as variable speed.

Adjustable- and variable-speed drives may be purely mechanical (termed variators), electromechanical, hydraulic, or electronic.

Sometimes motor drive refers to a drive used to control a motor and therefore gets interchanged with VFD or VSD.

== Electric motors ==
AC electric motors can be run in fixed-speed operation determined by the number of stator pole pairs in the motor and the frequency of the alternating current supply. AC motors can be made for "pole changing" operation, reconnecting the stator winding to vary the number of poles so that two, sometimes three, speeds are obtained. For example a machine with eight physical pairs of poles, could be connected to allow running with either four or eight pole pairs, giving two speeds - at 60 Hz, these would be 1800 RPM and 900 RPM. If speed changes are rare, the motor may be initially connected for one speed then re-wired for the other speed as process conditions change, or, magnetic contactors can be used to switch between the two speeds as process needs fluctuate. Connections for more than three speeds are uneconomic.

The number of such fixed-speed-operation speeds is constrained by cost as number of pole pairs increases. If many different speeds or continuously variable speeds are required, other methods are required.

Direct-current motors allow for changes of speed by adjusting the shunt field current. Another way of changing speed of a direct current motor is to change the voltage applied to the armature.

An adjustable-speed motor drive might consist of an electric motor and controller that is used to adjust the motor's operating speed. The combination of a constant-speed motor and a continuously adjustable mechanical speed-changing device might also be called an "adjustable speed motor drive". Power electronics-based variable-frequency drives are rapidly making older technologies redundant.

== Reasons for using adjustable-speed drives ==
Process control and energy conservation are the two primary reasons for using an adjustable-speed drive. Historically, adjustable-speed drives were developed for process control, but energy conservation has emerged as an equally important objective.

=== Acceleration control ===

An adjustable-speed drive can often provide smoother operation compared to an alternative fixed-speed mode of operation. For example, in a sewage lift station sewage usually flows through sewer pipes under the force of gravity to a wet well location. From there it is pumped up to a treatment process. When fixed-speed pumps are used, the pumps are set to start when the level of the liquid in the wet well reaches some high point and stop when the level has been reduced to a low point. Cycling the pumps on and off results in frequent high surges of electric current to start the motors that results in electromagnetic and thermal stresses in the motors and power control equipment, the pumps and pipes are subjected to mechanical and hydraulic stresses, and the sewage treatment process is forced to accommodate surges in the flow of sewage through the process. When adjustable-speed drives are used, the pumps operate continuously at a speed that increases as the wet well level increases. This matches the outflow to the average inflow and provides a much smoother operation of the process.

=== Saving energy by using efficient adjustable-speed drives ===
Fans and pumps consume a large part of the energy used by industrial electrical motors. Where fans and pumps serve a varying process load, a simple way to vary the delivered quantity of fluid is with a damper or valve in the outlet of the fan or pump, which by its increased pressure drop, reduces the flow in the process. However, this additional pressure drop represents energy loss. Sometimes it is economically practical to put in some device that recovers this otherwise lost energy. With a variable-speed drive on the pump or fan, the supply can be adjusted to match demand and no extra loss is introduced.

For example, when a fan is driven directly by a fixed-speed motor, the airflow is designed for the maximum demand of the system, and so will usually be higher than it needs to be. Airflow can be regulated using a damper but it is more efficient to directly regulate fan motor speed. Following the affinity laws, for 50% of the airflow, the variable-speed motor consumes about 20% of the input power (amps). The fixed-speed motor still consumes about 85% of the input power at half the flow.

==== Ship Energy Efficiency ====
Variable-frequency drives (VFDs) are used aboard ships to regulate the speed of auxiliary machinery, including engine-room ventilation fans, cooling seawater pumps and low-temperature freshwater pumps. By matching motor speed and power consumption to operational demand, VFDs can reduce auxiliary energy use, fuel consumption and associated carbon dioxide (CO₂) emissions, thereby supporting compliance with the International Maritime Organization’s Carbon Intensity Indicator (CII) requirements and broader ship decarbonisation efforts. One example is the SELMA SEES system, which applies VFDs and a PLC/SCADA control platform to optimise the operation of engine-room auxiliary equipment.

== Types of drives ==
Some prime movers (internal combustion engines, reciprocating or turbine steam engines, water wheels, and others) have a range of operating speeds which can be varied continuously (by adjusting fuel rate or similar means). However, efficiency may be low at extremes of the speed range, and there may be system reasons why the prime mover speed cannot be maintained at very low or very high speeds.

Before electric motors were invented, mechanical speed changers were used to control the mechanical power provided by water wheels and steam engines. When electric motors came into use, means of controlling their speed were developed almost immediately. Today, various types of mechanical drives, hydraulic drives and electric drives compete with one another in the industrial drives market.

=== Mechanical drives ===
There are two types of mechanical drives, variable-pitch drives, and traction drives.

Variable-pitch drives are pulley and belt drives in which the pitch diameter of one or both pulleys can be adjusted.

Traction drives transmit power through metal rollers running against mating metal rollers (similar to continuously variable transmission). The input-output speed ratio is adjusted by moving the rollers to change the diameters of the contact path. Many different roller shapes and mechanical designs have been used.

=== Hydraulic adjustable-speed drives ===
There are three types of hydraulic drives, those are: hydrostatic drives, hydrodynamic drives and hydroviscous drives.

A hydrostatic drive consists of a hydraulic pump and a hydraulic motor. Since positive displacement pumps and motors are used, one revolution of the pump or motor corresponds to a set volume of fluid flow that is determined by the displacement regardless of speed or torque. Speed is regulated by regulating the fluid flow with a valve or by changing the displacement of the pump or motor. Many different design variations have been used. A swash plate drive employs an axial piston pump or motor in which the swash plate angle can be changed to adjust the displacement and thus adjust the speed.

Hydrodynamic drives or fluid couplings use oil to transmit torque between an impeller on the constant-speed input shaft and a rotor on the adjustable-speed output shaft. The torque converter in the automatic transmission of a car is a hydrodynamic drive.

A hydroviscous drive consists of one or more discs connected to an input shaft pressed against a similar disc or discs connected to an output shaft. Torque is transmitted from the input shaft to the output shaft through an oil film between the discs. The transmitted torque is proportional to the pressure exerted by a hydraulic cylinder that presses the discs together. This effect may be used as a clutch, such as the Hele-Shaw clutch, or as a variable-speed drive, such as the Beier variable-ratio gear.

=== Continuously variable transmission (CVT) ===
Mechanical and hydraulic adjustable-speed drives are usually called "transmissions" or "continuously variable transmissions" when they are used in vehicles, farm equipment and some other types of equipment.

=== Electric adjustable-speed drives ===
==== Types of control ====
Control can mean either manually adjustable – by means of a potentiometer or linear hall effect device, (which is more resistant to dust and grease) or it can also be automatically controlled, for example, by using a rotational detector such as a Gray code optical encoder.

==== Types of drives ====
There are three general categories of electric drives: DC motor drives, eddy-current drives and AC motor drives. Each of these general types can be further divided into numerous variations. Electric drives generally include both an electric motor and a speed control unit or system. The term drive is often applied to the controller without the motor. In the early days of electric drive technology, electromechanical control systems were used. Later, electronic controllers were designed using various types of vacuum tubes. As suitable solid state electronic components became available, new controller designs incorporated the latest electronic technology.

==== DC drives ====
DC drives are DC motor speed control systems. Since the speed of a DC motor is directly proportional to armature voltage and inversely proportional to motor flux (which is a function of field current), either armature voltage or field current can be used to control speed.

==== Eddy-current drives ====
An eddy-current drive (sometimes called a "Dynamatic drive", after one of the most common brand names) consists of a fixed-speed motor (generally an induction motor) and an eddy-current clutch. The clutch contains a fixed-speed rotor and an adjustable-speed rotor separated by a small air gap. A direct current in a field coil produces a magnetic field that determines the torque transmitted from the input rotor to the output rotor. The controller provides closed loop speed regulation by varying clutch current, only allowing the clutch to transmit enough torque to operate at the desired speed. Speed feedback is typically provided via an integral AC tachometer.

Eddy-current drives are slip-controlled systems the slip energy of which is necessarily all dissipated as heat. Such drives are therefore generally less efficient than AC/DC–AC conversion based drives. The motor develops the torque required by the load and operates at full speed. The output shaft transmits the same torque to the load, but turns at a slower speed. Since power is proportional to torque multiplied by speed, the input power is proportional to motor speed times operating torque while the output power is output speed times operating torque. The difference between the motor speed and the output speed is called the slip speed. Power proportional to the slip speed times operating torque is dissipated as heat in the clutch. While it has been surpassed by the variable-frequency drive in most variable-speed applications, the eddy-current clutch is still often used to couple motors to high-inertia loads that are frequently stopped and started, such as stamping presses, conveyors, hoisting machinery, and some larger machine tools, allowing gradual starting, with less maintenance than a mechanical clutch or hydraulic transmission.

==== AC drives ====
AC drives are AC motor speed control systems.

A slip-controlled wound-rotor induction motor (WRIM) drive controls speed by varying motor slip via rotor slip rings either by electronically recovering slip power fed back to the stator bus or by varying the resistance of external resistors in the rotor circuit. Along with eddy-current drives, resistance-based WRIM drives have lost popularity because they are less efficient than AC/DC–AC-based WRIM drives and are used only in special situations.

Slip energy recovery systems return energy to the WRIM's stator bus, converting slip energy and feeding it back to the stator supply. Such recovered energy would otherwise be wasted as heat in resistance-based WRIM drives. Slip energy recovery variable-speed drives are used in such applications as large pumps and fans, wind turbines, shipboard propulsion systems, large hydro-pumps and generators and utility energy storage flywheels. Early slip energy recovery systems using electromechanical components for AC/DC-AC conversion (i.e., consisting of rectifier, DC motor and AC generator) are termed Kramer drives, with more recent systems using variable-frequency drives (VFDs) being referred to as static Kramer drives.

In general, a VFD in its most basic configuration controls the speed of an induction or synchronous motor by adjusting the frequency of the power supplied to the motor.

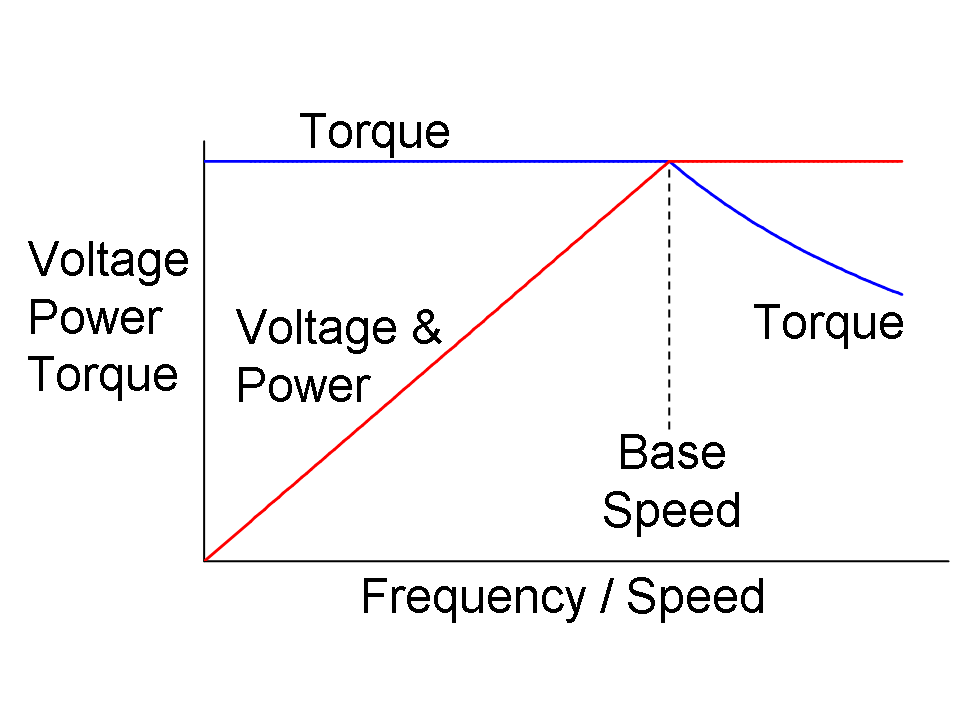

When changing VFD frequency in standard low-performance variable-torque applications using Volt-per-Hertz (V/Hz) control, the AC motor's voltage-to-frequency ratio can be maintained constant, and its power can be varied, between the minimum and maximum operating frequencies up to a base frequency. Constant voltage operation above base frequency, and therefore with reduced V/Hz ratio, provides reduced torque and constant power capability.

Regenerative AC drives are a type of AC drive which have the capacity to recover the braking energy of a load moving faster than the motor speed (an overhauling load) and return it to the power system.

== See also ==
- DC injection braking
- Doubly-fed electric machine
- Regenerative variable-frequency drives
- Scherbius Drive
