= Frequency changer =

Electronic device

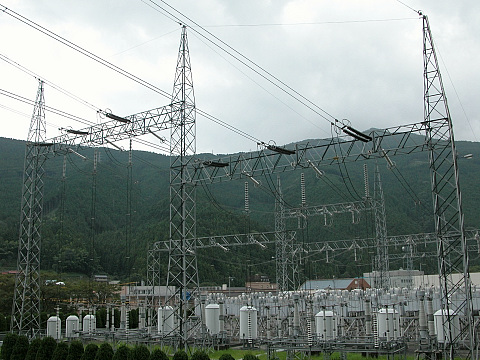
The Sakuma frequency converter station is one of the stations that links Japan's two grids (see Electricity sector in Japan § Transmission).

A frequency changer, or frequency converter, is electronic or electromechanical equipment that converts alternating current (AC) of one frequency to alternating current of another frequency. The equipment may also change the voltage, but if it does, that is incidental to its principal purpose, since voltage conversion of alternating current is much easier to achieve than frequency conversion.

Traditionally, these were electromechanical machines called motor–generator sets. There were also mercury arc rectifiers or vacuum tubes in use. With the advent of solid-state electronics, it has become possible to build completely electronic frequency changers. These usually consist of a rectifier stage (producing direct current) which is then inverted to produce AC of the desired frequency. The inverter may use thyristors, IGCTs or IGBTs. If voltage conversion is desired, a transformer will usually be included in either the AC input or output circuitry and this transformer may also provide galvanic isolation between the input and output AC circuits. A battery may also be added to the DC circuitry to improve the converter's ride-through of brief outages in the input power.

Frequency changers vary in power-handling capability from a few watts to megawatts.

== Applications ==
Frequency changers are used for converting bulk AC power from one frequency to another, when two adjacent power grids operate at different utility frequency.

A variable-frequency drive (VFD) is a type of frequency changer used for speed control of AC motors such as used for pumps and fans. The speed of a synchronous or induction AC motor is dependent on the frequency of the AC power supply, so changing frequency allows the motor speed to be changed. This allows fan or pump output to be varied to match process conditions, which can provide energy savings.

A cycloconverter is also a type of frequency changer. Unlike a VFD, which is an indirect frequency changer since it uses an AC-DC stage and then a DC-AC stage, a cycloconverter is a direct frequency changer because it uses no intermediate stages. A cycloconverter can only provide a lower frequency at its output.

Another application is in the aerospace and airline industries. Often airplanes use 400 Hz power so a 50 Hz or 60 Hz to 400 Hz frequency converter is needed for use in the ground power unit used to power the airplane while it is on the ground. Airlines might also utilize the converters to provide in-air wall current to passengers for use with laptops and the like. Radio and combat systems equipment on Navy warships is often also powered by 400 Hz to reduce noise on the DC signal after rectification.

In renewable energy systems, frequency converters are an essential component of doubly fed induction generators (DFIGs) as used in modern multi-megawatt class wind turbines.

A high-voltage direct current system can serve as a frequency converter for large loads.

== Alternate uses ==
Frequency converter may also refer to a much-lower-powered circuit that converts radio frequency signals at one frequency to another frequency, especially in a superheterodyne receiver. See frequency mixer. The circuit usually consists of a local oscillator and frequency mixer (analog multiplier) that generates sum and difference frequencies from the input and local oscillator, of which one (the intermediate frequency) will be required for further amplification, while the others are filtered out. The same result was achieved historically by the pentagrid converter or a triode and hexode in a single tube, but can be implemented in transistor radios economically by a single transistor functioning as a self-oscillating mixer.

== See also ==
- Cascade converter
- Static inverter plant
- Variable-frequency transformer
