= Motor–generator =

Device for converting electrical power to another form

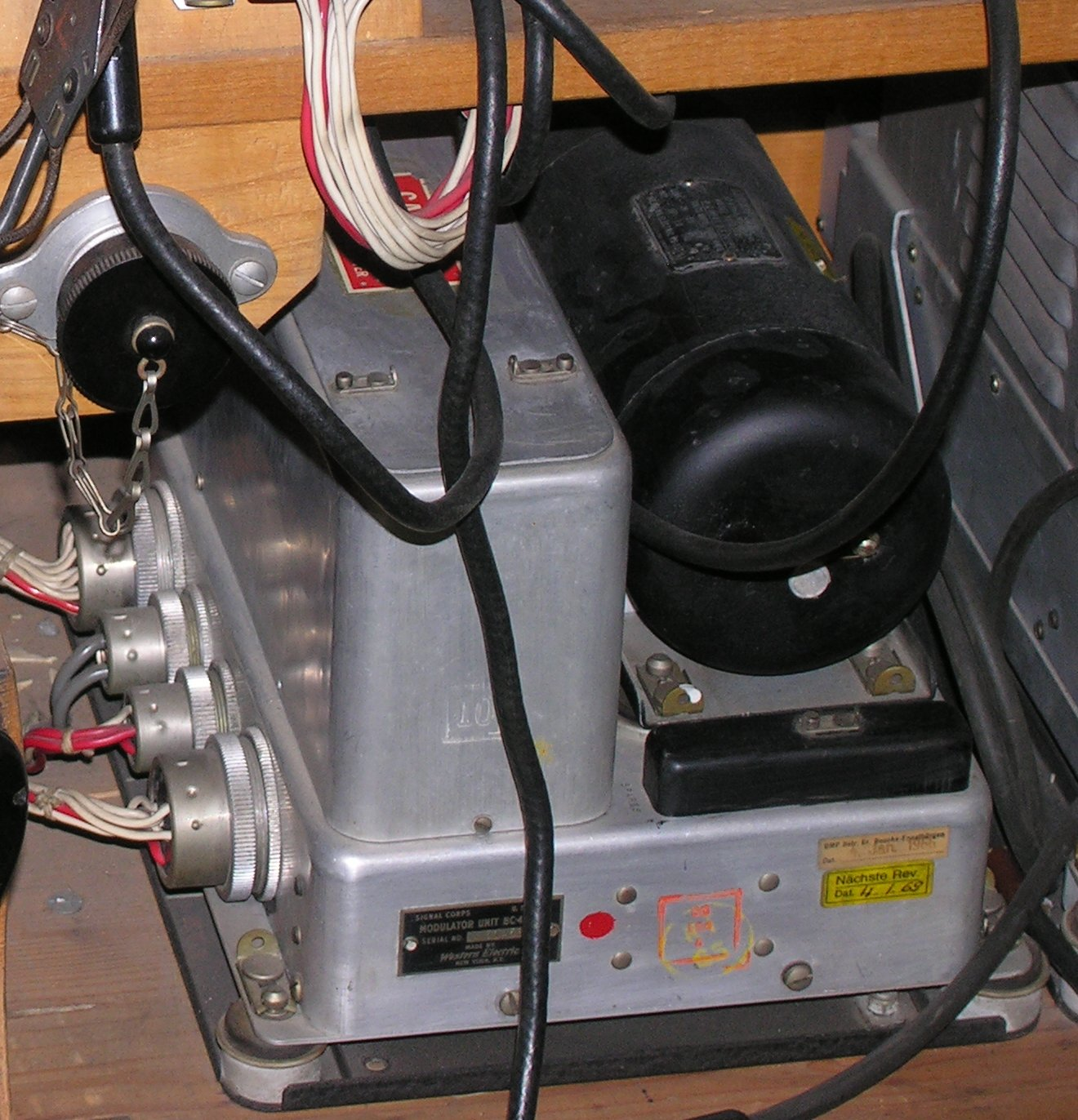
Aircraft radio modulator unit from the Second World War, showing a dynamotor (the black cylinder) which converts the aircraft's 24–28 V DC to 500 V DC for the transmitter. Dübendorf Museum of Military Aviation

A motor–generator (an MG set) is a device for converting electrical power to another form. Motor–generator sets are used to convert frequency, voltage, or phase of power. They may also be used to isolate electrical loads from the electrical power supply line. Large motor–generators were widely used to convert industrial amounts of power while smaller motor–generators (such as the one shown in the picture) were used to convert battery power to higher DC voltages.

While a motor–generator set may consist of distinct motor and generator machines coupled together, a single unit dynamotor (for dynamo–motor) has the motor coils and the generator coils wound around a single rotor; both the motor and generator therefore share the same outer field coils or magnets. Typically the motor coils are driven from a commutator on one end of the shaft, while the generator coils provide output to another commutator on the other end of the shaft. The entire rotor and shaft assembly is smaller, lighter, and cheaper than a pair of machines, and does not require exposed drive shafts.

Low-powered consumer devices built before 1933, such as vacuum tube vehicle radio receivers, did not use expensive, noisy and bulky motor–generators. Instead, they used an inverter circuit consisting of a vibrator (a self-exciting relay) and a transformer to produce the higher voltages required for the vacuum tubes from the vehicle's 6 or 12 V battery.

== Electrical power handling ==
In the context of electric power generation and large fixed electrical power systems, a motor–generator consists of an electric motor mechanically coupled to an electric generator (or alternator). The motor runs on the electrical input current while the generator creates the electrical output current, with power flowing between the two machines as a mechanical torque; this provides electrical isolation and some buffering of the power between the two electrical systems.

One use is to eliminate spikes and variations in "dirty power" (power conditioning) or to provide phase matching between different electrical systems.

=== Flywheel–generator ===
Another use is to buffer extreme loads on the power system. For example, tokamak fusion devices impose very large peak loads, but relatively low average loads, on the electrical grid. The DIII-D tokamak at General Atomics, the Princeton Large Torus (PLT) at the Princeton Plasma Physics Laboratory, and the Nimrod synchrotron at the Rutherford Appleton Laboratory each used large flywheels on multiple motor–generator rigs to level the load imposed on the electrical system: The motor side slowly accelerated a large flywheel to store energy, which was consumed rapidly during a fusion experiment as the generator side acted as a brake on the flywheel. Similarly, the next-generation U.S. Navy aircraft carrier Electromagnetic Aircraft Launch System (EMALS) will use a flywheel motor–generator rig to supply power instantaneously for aircraft launches at greater than the ship's installed generator capacity. In addition to the above specialized applications, flywheel–generator systems have been commercialized for use in data centers as an adjunct or alternative to more conventional battery or generator-based uninterruptible power supplies (UPSs).

== Conversions ==
An MG set used to provide a variable three phase AC voltage for an Electron Beam Welding Machine high voltage power supply.

Motor–generators may be used for various conversions including:

- Alternating current (AC) to direct current (DC)
- DC to AC
- DC at one voltage to DC at another voltage. (Also called a dynamotor, short for dynamo-motor)
- Creating or balancing a three-wire DC system.
- AC at one frequency to AC at another harmonically-related frequency
- AC at a fixed voltage to AC of a variable voltage
- AC single-phase to AC three-phase

== Variable AC voltage power supply ==
Before solid state AC voltage regulation was available or cost effective, motor generator sets were used to provide a variable AC voltage. The DC voltage to the generator's armature would be varied manually or electronically to control the output voltage. When used in this fashion, the MG set is equivalent to an isolated variable transformer.

== High-frequency machines ==
An Alexanderson alternator is a motor-driven, high-frequency alternator which provides radio frequency power. In the early days of radio communication, the high frequency carrier wave had to be produced mechanically using an alternator with many poles driven at high speeds. Alexanderson alternators produced RF up to 600 kHz, with large units capable of 500 kW power output. While electromechanical converters were regularly used for long wave transmissions in the first three decades of the 20th century, electronic techniques were required at higher frequencies. The Alexanderson alternator was largely replaced by the vacuum tube oscillator in the 1920s.

== Motor–generators used to increase ride-through ==
Motor–generators have even been used where the input and output currents are essentially the same. In this case, the mechanical inertia of the MG set is used to filter out transients in the input power. The output's electric current can be very clean (noise free) and will be able to ride through brief blackouts and switching transients at the input to the MG set. This may enable, for example, the flawless cut-over from mains power to AC power provided by a diesel generator set.

The motor–generator set may contain a large flywheel to improve its ride-through; however, consideration must be taken in this application as the motor–generator will lose speed and may draw a large current when power returns or the circuit-breaker is re-closed. If the speed loss is excessive (the power outage is too long), the re-closure current will trip the protection circuit-breakers, resulting in a shut down. The in-rush current during re-closure will depend on many factors, however. As an example, a 250 kVA motor–generator operating at 300 ampere of full load current will require 1550 ampere of in-rush current during a re-closure after five seconds. This example used a fixed mounted flywheel sized to result in a 1/2 Hz per second slew rate. The motor–generator was a vertical type two-bearing machine with oil-bath bearings.

Motors and generators may be coupled by a non-conductive shaft in facilities that need to closely control electromagnetic radiation, or where high isolation from transient surge voltages is required.

== Modern use of motor–generators ==
Motor–generator sets have been replaced by semiconductor devices for some purposes. In the past, a popular use for MG sets was in elevators. Since accurate speed control of the hoisting machine was required, the impracticality of varying the frequency to a high power AC motor meant that the use of an MG set with a DC hoist motor was a near industry-standard solution. Modern AC variable-frequency drive electronics with compatible motors have increasingly supplanted traditional MG-driven elevator installations, since electronic AC drives are typically more efficient by 50% or more than MG DC-powered machinery.

Another use for MG sets was in the southern region of British Rail. They were used to convert the 600 V DC – 850 V DC line supply voltage from the third rail into 70 V DC to power the controls of the EMU stock in use. These have since been replaced with solid state converters on new rolling stock. MG locomotives have also commonly been used for long distance rail Diesel locomotive transmission throughout the world, due to reliability and wear issues with mechanical and fluid transmissions, but this is generally being replaced with smaller engines with conventional or MG transmission on each carriage. Long distance electric locomotives with high voltage overhead power supply used MG transmission, but this is generally being replaced with distributed motor drive on each carriage with electronic power control and conversion.

Similarly, MG sets were used in the PCC streetcar to produce a 36VDC output from the 600VDC traction supply. The low voltage output charges the streetcar's batteries and supplies current for control and auxiliary equipment (including headlights, gong ringers, door motors and electromagnetic track brakes).

Motor–generator sets were often used to provide the high-current D.C. power for carbon arc lamps in large movie projectors in the 1950-60's era, before the carbon electrode arc light was replaced with modern xenon arc lamp projection systems (starting in 1963 in the U.S.).

In industrial settings where harmonic cancellation, frequency conversion, or line isolation is needed, MG sets remain a popular solution. A useful feature of motor–generators is that they can handle large short-term overloads better than semiconductor devices of the same average load rating. Consider that the thermally current-limited components of a large semiconductor inverter are solid-state switches massing a few grams with a thermal time constant to their heat sinks of likely more than 100 ms, whereas the thermally current limited components of an MG are copper windings massing sometimes hundreds of kilograms which are intrinsically attached to their own large thermal mass. They also have inherently excellent resistance to electrostatic discharge (ESD).

== See also ==
- Booster (electric power)
- Cascade converter
- Diesel generator
- Engine-generator
- Frequency converter
- Harry Ward Leonard
- Head-end power
- Inverter (electrical)
- Rotary converter
- Rotary phase converter
- Three-phase electric power
