= Arthur Scherbius =

German electrical engineer (1878–1929)

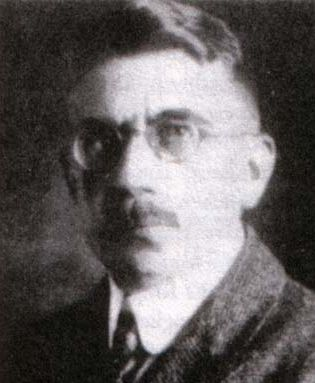
- Arthur Scherbius, inventor of the Enigma cipher.
- Born: 30 October 1878; Frankfurt, German Empire
- Died: 13 May 1929 (aged 50); Berlin, Germany
- Education: Technical University of Munich & Leibniz University Hannover, Dr.-Ing.
- Engineering career
- Significant design: Enigma machine Rotor machine Scherbius Drive

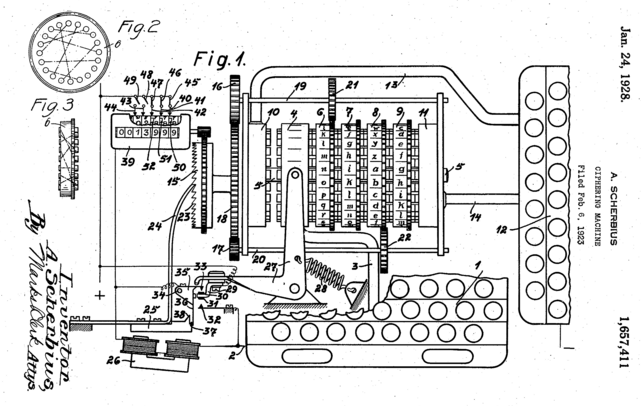
Scherbius' Enigma patent – U.S. patent 1,657,411, which was granted in 1928

Jacob Ludolf Arthur Scherbius (30 October 1878 – 13 May 1929) was a German electrical engineer who is best known for inventing the mechanical rotor cipher Enigma machine. He patented the invention and later sold the machine under the brand name Enigma. Starting in 1923 the Enigma was used by the Reichswehr who began to encrypt their communications in 1930 and subsequently from March 1935, the Wehrmacht onwards to encrypt its secret communications

== Life ==
Scherbius was born in Frankfurt am Main, Germany. He was the son of the Frankfurt merchant Gustav Scherbius (1836–1907) and his wife Hedwig, née Nacken (1854–1954). He attended primary and secondary school in his hometown and studied mechanical engineering and electrical engineering—disciplines not yet separated at the time—at the Leibniz University Hannover from 1899 to 1903, a period interrupted by two semesters (1901–1902) at the Technical University of Munich. In 1903, he obtained the academic degree of Diplom-Ingenieur in Hanover and subsequently worked as a project engineer for the company Felten & Guilleaume-Lahmayer. At the same time, he wrote his dissertation, titled "Vorschläge zum Bau eines indirekt wirkenden Wasser-Turbinen-Reglers" ("Proposal for the Construction of an Indirect Water Turbine Governor"), and was awarded the degree of Doktoringenieur by the Technical University of Hanover on 14 July 1904.

== Career ==
After a brief stint working at Siemens Schuckert GmbH, he set up his own business in 1905 and invented circuits for regulating induction motors. He sold the rights to use his patents to Brown, Boveri & Cie in Baden in Switzerland, General Electric, and other companies. From 1906 to 1912, he worked at the BBC within a close-knit group comprising the owners—Brown and Boveri—and development engineers such as electrical engineers Karl Schnetzler, Heinrich Meyer-Delius, Fritz Marguerre, H. A. W. Klinkhamer, and Leo Pungs.[2] His inventions were also manufactured there. He became famous for the Scherbius circuit —a cascade arrangement of three-phase and AC commutator motors that enabled low-loss speed control. This system saw widespread use in Europe and the USA for rolling mill drives, as well as in the mining and metallurgical industries for pumping systems, waterworks, compressors, and fans. Scherbius also worked on mercury-arc rectifiers and served as a consultant for Siemens-Schuckertwerke. In a 1933 dissertation at the Swiss Federal Institute of Technology in Zurich, Max Leumann described both Brown Boveri and Scherbius patents.

During World War I, Scherbius was initially employed as an instructor of wireless telegraphy, then from 1917 as an assistant operations manager, i.e., deputy head of a department, in the Weapons and Munitions Procurement Office (WuMBA). Scherbius applied for a patent that was filed 23 February 1918, for a cipher machine based on rotating wired wheels that is now known as a rotor machine. After the armistice, at the end of 1918, he joined the technical department of the Reich Exploitation Office as a consultant and was also active in the Armistice Commission and the Army Peace Treaty Commission. At the same time, he worked on energy transmission using high-voltage direct current, but was unable to complete the development of a high-voltage direct current machine.

In Sweden, he had purchased patents from Birka Regulator AB, based on whose principles he developed a small and inexpensive thermostat, which he considered a key component for electrical household appliances. In 1918, he and Ernst Richard Ritter founded the company "Scherbius & Ritter" in Berlin-Wannsee. The company operated an electrotechnical factory on Königstrasse in Wannsee, where a thermoregulated heating pad and thermostats were manufactured in large quantities. They called it the "Scherip" (Sharp) heating pad. Ritter's company, "Dipl.-Ing. E. Richard Ritter & Co.", had represented a number of manufacturers of electrotechnical devices in Berlin since 1911. It was also involved in the development of the Enigma machine.

In 1923–24, Scherbius and Ritter each built a house on a plot of land in Wannsee (Lindenstraße 5 and 6) owned by their joint company. Ritter’s house was larger and equipped with the latest advancements in applied electricity. Scherbius’s house was designed by the same architect, Otto Streu from Nowawes. In September 1924, the Ritter family and Scherbius—along with his wife, Elisabeth (1896–1945)—moved into their respective homes.

== The Enigma machine ==
Illustrations of the commercial machine in an article by Scherbius in the ETZ from 1923.

During World War I, Scherbius became familiar with the challenges of encrypting radio transmissions, a field that became a new area of activity for him. As early as 23 February 1918, he filed his first patent for an encryption machine based on the rotor principle. In April 1918, the firm "Dipl.-Ing. E. Richard Ritter & Co."—which had taken on commercial representation—offered the encryption machine to the Great General Headquarters and the Imperial Naval Office. This prototype demonstrated the rotor machine principle and, in accordance with the patent, displayed the output via incandescent lamps. Two units were tested by the military while the war was still ongoing; although the machine's fundamental suitability was acknowledged, there were no plans to introduce it into service at that time. Scherbius was referred to the Foreign Office. After they, too, showed little interest, plans were made to market a version for the general public through the company Scherbius & Ritter, founded in 1920.

The first civilian model—the commercial machine (pictured)—was very large, weighed approximately 50 kg, and resembled a cash register. The subsequent models A, B, and C continued the line of lamp-based machines established by the prototypes. Weighing 12 kg, these were portable and resembled a typewriter housed in a wooden case measuring 34 × 28 × 15 centimeters. In November 1921, Scherbius transferred his rights to the Berlin-based firm Gewerkschaft Securitas, which was subsequently granted patent DRP 416219 for a "cipher apparatus" in 1925.

On 9 July 1923, the company—together with several investors—founded Chiffriermaschinen-Aktiengesellschaft (Chiffriermaschinen AG) in Berlin (W 35, Steglitzer Str. 2; today Pohlstraße, Berlin-Tiergarten). Paul Bernstein served as a development engineer at the firm until 1925. Scherbius also served on the board of ChiMaAG for a time after 1925.

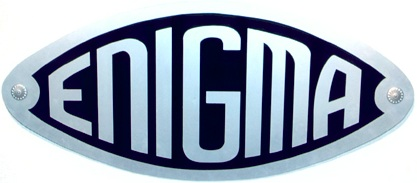
Brand label of arguably his most famous invention

The distinctive brand name "Enigma" also emerged during the second half of 1923; it was evidently chosen based on the Greek word "ainigma" (enigma), which carries the fitting meaning of "riddle" or "mystery." The first known publication featuring the new name "Enigma" dates to 1 September 1923.

In his book "Historische Notizen zur Informatik" (Historical Notes on Computer Science), the German cryptology academic Friedrich L. Bauer expressed the view that:

...it speaks to Arthur Scherbius's broad education that he chose this word to give a fitting name to his invention—a ciphering and deciphering machine.".

However, there are no known sources that unequivocally identify Scherbius as the person who chose the name. An argument against his authorship is the fact that the name did not appear until 1923—a time when Scherbius no longer had control over his own invention.

In 1923 and 1924, the machine was presented to the public at several congresses and postal exhibitions in Bern, Stockholm, and Leipzig. It was promoted and marketed as a "device for the transmission of business communications and telegrams." Because telegrams transmitted via postal services could easily be intercepted by unauthorized parties, Chiffriermaschinen AG recommended the "Enigma" encryption system. In the Elektrotechnische Zeitschrift (ETZ) journal of November 1923, Scherbius described the machine's operation in detail and noted:

"In addition to security, radiotelegraphy must meet the most rigorous requirements regarding operational utility, speed, ease of use—to minimize sources of error—and the ability to easily rectify transmission errors."

The article concludes with the following sentence:

"The machine was developed by the firm Scherbius & Ritter in Wannsee in Berlin. The latest model shown here, however, was built by Gewerkschaft Securitas —which acquired all the patents for production purposes—with the collaboration of the former firm".

== Death ==
Scherbius however did not live to see the widespread use of his machine. In 1929, Scherbius died from internal injuries sustained in a horse carriage accident in Wannsee, where he had lived since 1924.
