= Rotor (electric) =

Non-stationary part of a rotary electric motor

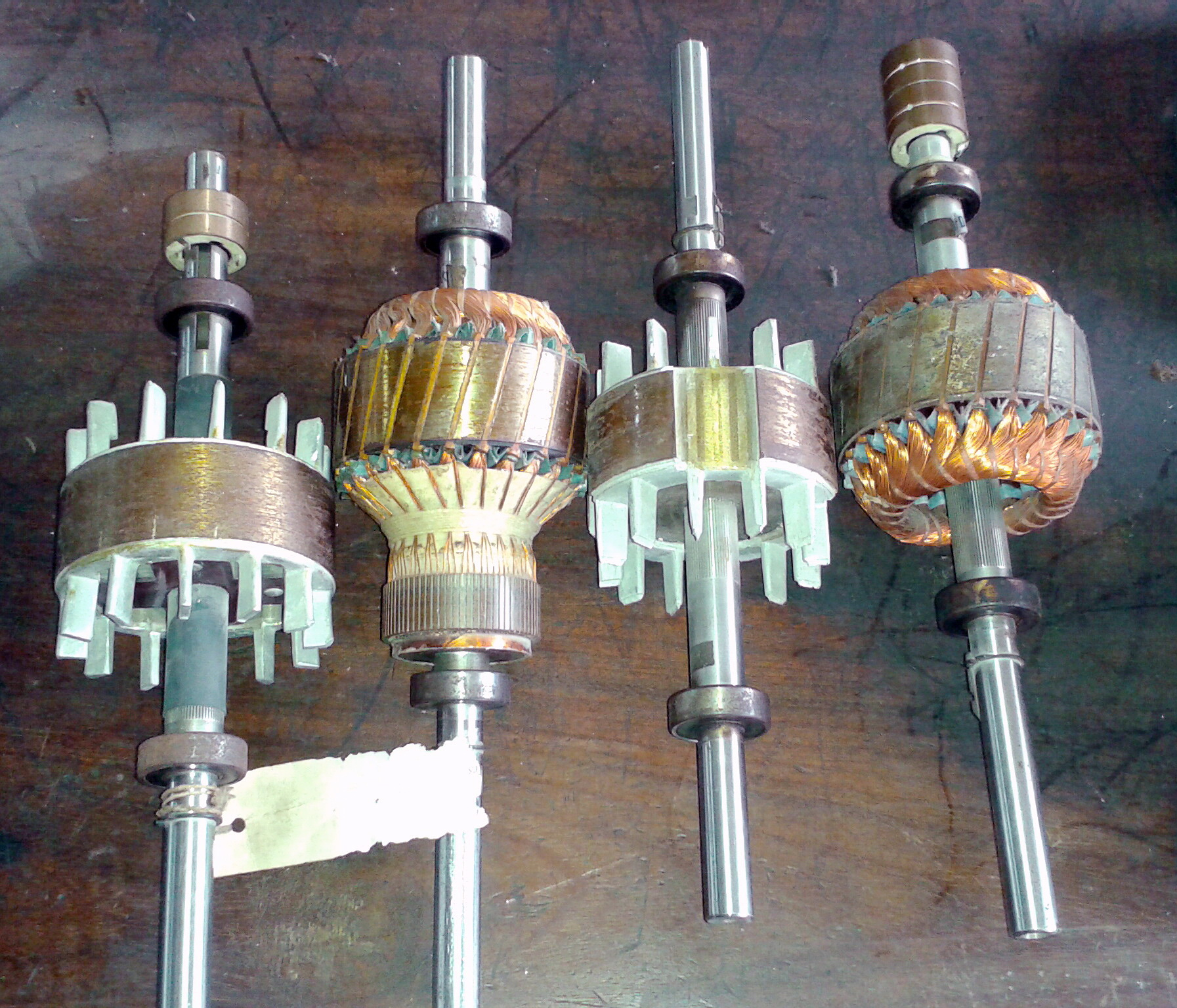
A selection of various types of rotors

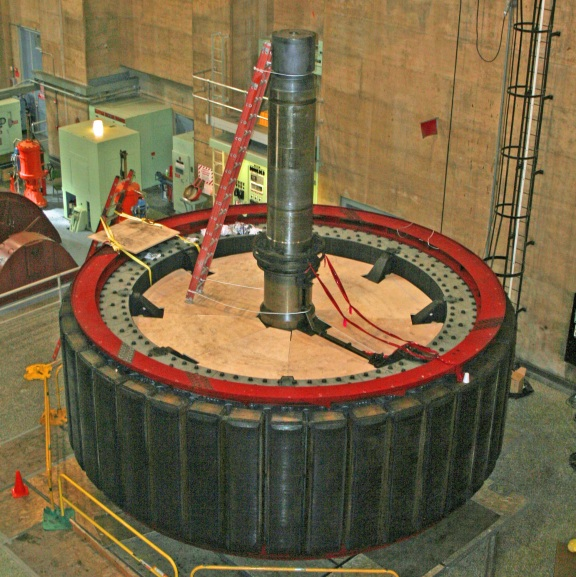
Rotor from Hoover Dam generator

The rotor is a moving component of an electromagnetic system in the electric motor, electric generator, or alternator. Its rotation is due to the interaction between the windings and magnetic fields which produces a torque around the rotor's axis.

== Early development ==
An early example of electromagnetic rotation was the first rotary machine built by Ányos Jedlik with electromagnets and a commutator, in 1826-27. Other pioneers in the field of electricity include Hippolyte Pixii who built an alternating current generator in 1832, and William Ritchie's construction of an electromagnetic generator with four rotor coils, a commutator and brushes, also in 1832. Development quickly included more useful applications such as Moritz Hermann Jacobi's motor that could lift 10 to 12 pounds with a speed of one foot per second, about 15 watts of mechanical power in 1834. In 1835, Francis Watkins describes an electrical "toy" he created; he is generally regarded as one of the first to understand the interchangeability of motor and generator.

== Type and construction of rotors ==
Induction (asynchronous) motors, generators and alternators (synchronous) have an electromagnetic system consisting of a stator and rotor. There are two designs for the rotor in an induction motor: squirrel cage and wound. In generators and alternators, the rotor designs are salient pole or cylindrical.

=== Squirrel-cage rotor ===
The squirrel-cage rotor consists of laminated steel in the core with evenly spaced bars of copper or aluminium placed axially around the periphery, permanently shorted at the ends by the end rings. This simple and rugged construction makes it the favorite for most applications. The assembly has a twist: the bars are slanted, or skewed, to reduce magnetic hum and slot harmonics and to reduce the tendency of locking. Housed in the stator, the rotor and stator teeth can lock when they are in equal number and the magnets position themselves equally apart, opposing rotation in both directions. Bearings at each end mount the rotor in its housing, with one end of the shaft protruding to allow the attachment of the load. In some motors, there is an extension at the non-driving end for speed sensors or other electronic controls. The generated torque forces motion through the rotor to the load.

=== Wound rotor ===
The wound rotor is a cylindrical core made of steel lamination with slots to hold the wires for its 3-phase windings which are evenly spaced at 120 electrical degrees apart and connected in a 'Y' configuration. The rotor winding terminals are brought out and attached to the three slips rings with brushes, on the shaft of the rotor. Brushes on the slip rings allow for external three-phase resistors to be connected in series to the rotor windings for providing speed control. The external resistances become a part of the rotor circuit to produce a large torque when starting the motor. As the motor speeds up, the resistances can be reduced to zero.

Salient pole rotor

Cylindrical rotor

=== Salient pole rotor ===
A salient pole rotor is built upon a stack of "star shaped" steel laminations, typically with 2 or 3 or 4 or 6, maybe even 18 or more "radial prongs" sticking out from the middle, each of which is wound with copper wire to form a discrete outward facing electromagnet pole. The inward facing ends of each prong are magnetically grounded into the common central body of the rotor. The poles are supplied by direct current or magnetized by permanent magnets. The armature with a three-phase winding is on the stator where voltage is induced. Direct current (DC), from an external exciter or from a diode bridge mounted on the rotor shaft, produces a magnetic field and energizes the rotating field windings and alternating current energizes the armature windings simultaneously.

A salient pole ends in a pole shoe, a high-permeability part with an outer surface shaped as a segment of a cylinder to homogenize the distribution of the magnetic flux to the stator.

=== Non-salient rotor ===
The cylindrical shaped rotor is made of a solid steel shaft with slots running along the outside length of the cylinder for holding the field windings of the rotor which are laminated copper bars inserted into the slots and is secured by wedges. The slots are insulated from the windings and are held at the end of the rotor by slip rings. An external direct current (DC) source is connected to the concentrically mounted slip rings with brushes running along the rings. The brushes make electrical contact with the rotating slip rings. DC current is also supplied through brushless excitation from a rectifier mounted on the machine shaft that converts alternating current to direct current.

== Operating principle ==
In a three-phase induction machine, alternating current supplied to the stator windings energizes it to create a rotating magnetic flux. The flux generates a magnetic field in the air gap between the stator and the rotor and induces a voltage which produces current through the rotor bars. The rotor circuit is shorted and current flows in the rotor conductors. The action of the rotating flux and the current produces a force that generates a torque to start the motor.

An alternator rotor is made up of a wire coil enveloped around an iron core. The magnetic component of the rotor is made from steel laminations to aid stamping conductor slots to specific shapes and sizes. As currents travel through the wire coil a magnetic field is created around the core, which is referred to as field current. The field current strength controls the power level of the magnetic field. Direct current (DC) drives the field current in one direction, and is delivered to the wire coil by a set of brushes and slip rings. Like any magnet, the magnetic field produced has a north and a south pole. The normal clockwise direction of the motor that the rotor is powering can be manipulated by using the magnets and magnetic fields installed in the design of the rotor, allowing the motor to run in reverse or counterclockwise.

== Characteristics of rotors ==
- Squirrel-cage rotor

This rotor rotates at a speed less than the stator rotating magnetic field or synchronous speed.
Rotor slip provides necessary induction of rotor currents for motor torque, which is in proportion to slip.
When rotor speed increases, the slip decreases.
Increasing the slip increases induced motor current, which in turn increases rotor current, resulting in a higher torque for increase load demands.

- Wound rotor

This rotor operates at constant speed and has lower starting current
External resistance added to rotor circuit, increases starting torque
Motor running efficiency improves as external resistance is reduced when motor speed up.
Higher torque and speed control

- Salient pole rotor

This rotor operates at a speed below 1500 rpm (revolutions per minute) and 40% of its rated torque without excitation
It has a large diameter and short axial length
Air gap is non uniform
Rotor has low mechanical strength

- Cylindrical rotor

The rotor operates at speed between 1500-3600 rpm
It has strong mechanical strength
Air gap is uniform
Its diameter is small and has a large axial length and requires a higher torque than salient pole rotor

A rotor is typically impregnated in varnish in a vacuum impregnation process for electrical insulation purposes. Alternatively the rotor can be encapsulated in epoxy to improve cooling, reduce noise and improve electrical insulation in wet conditions in applications such as electric vehicles and air conditioners.

== Rotor equations ==
=== Rotor bar voltage ===
The rotating magnetic field induces a voltage in the rotor bars as it passes over them. This equation applies to induced voltage in the rotor bars.

$$E=BL(V_{syn}-V_m)$$

where:

$E$ = induced voltage
$B$ = magnetic field
$L$ = conductor length
$V_{syn}$ = synchronous speed
$V_m$= conductor speed

=== Torque in rotor ===
A torque is produced by the force produced through the interactions of the magnetic field and current as expressed by the given: Ibid

$$F=(BxI)L$$
$$T=Fxr$$

where:

$F$ = force
$T$ = torque
$r$ = radius of rotor rings
$I$ = rotor bar

=== Induction motor slip ===
A stator magnetic field rotates at synchronous speed, $n_s$ Ibid

$$n_s=\frac{120f}{p}$$

where:

$f$ = frequency
$p$ = number of poles

If $n_m$ = rotor speed, the slip, S for an induction motor is expressed as:

$$s=\frac{n_s - n_m}{n_s} \times 100\%$$

mechanical speed of rotor, in terms of slip and synchronous speed:

$$n_m = (1-s)n_s$$
$$\omega_m=(1-s)\omega_s$$

Relative speed of slip:

$$n_{slip}=n_s-n_m$$

=== Frequency of induced voltages and currents ===
$$f_r= sf_e$$

== See also ==
- Armature (electrical engineering) - any "rotor" that carries some form of alternating current
- Balancing machine
- Commutator (electric)
- Electric motor
- Field coil
- Rotordynamics
- Stator
