= Louis Jean Baptiste Bergeron =

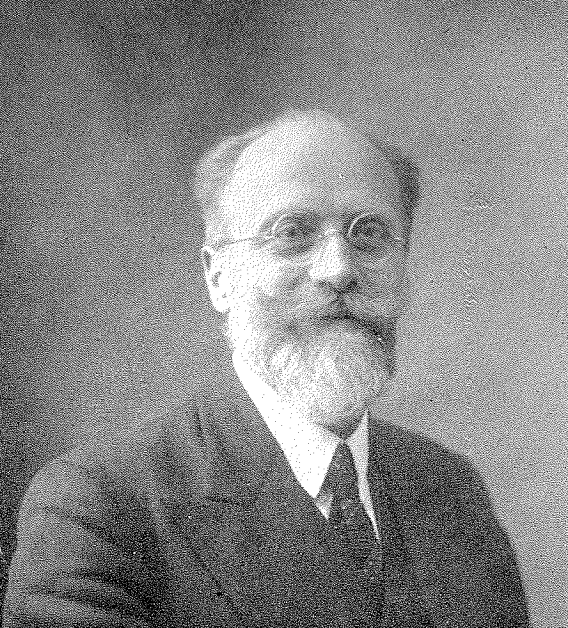
Image of Louis Bergeron ingénieur

Louis Jean Baptiste Bergeron (10 March 1876 – 23 February 1948) was a French entrepreneur, engineer and inventor.

Bergeron was born in Lagnieu. In 1900, he started work as an electrical engineer and made a career in the Farcot company in St Ouen, a factory specializing in steam engines and high-power electrical machines. In 1918, he co-founded the company Beaudrey-Bergeron with Beaudrey. Following an amicable split with Beaudrey, the company was renamed Bergeron S.A., which is now a part of Alstom.

He is remembered for his practical, mathematical methodology approach to studying water hammer in hydraulic pipe systems, which he also showed to be useful in the study of electromagnetic voltage/current surges in electricity systems. His last work," From water hammer in hydraulics to lightning surges in electricity," published posthumously, became a reference work in electrical engineering.

In electrical engineering, application of so-called "Bergeron equations" allows the calculation of travelling wave phenomena in "long" conductors using numerical analysis. Hermann W. Dommel used these "Bergeron equations" in the EMTP (electromagnetic transient program) software in the late 1960s.

== See also ==
- Bergeron diagram
