= Thyristor-switched capacitor =

A thyristor-switched capacitor (TSC) is a type of equipment used for compensating reactive power in electrical power systems. It consists of a power capacitor connected in series with a bidirectional thyristor valve and, usually, a current limiting reactor (inductor). The thyristor switched capacitor is an important component of a Static VAR Compensator (SVC), where it is often used in conjunction with a thyristor controlled reactor (TCR). Static VAR compensators are a member of the Flexible AC transmission system (FACTS) family.

== Circuit diagram ==
A TSC is usually a three-phase assembly, connected either in a delta or a star arrangement. Unlike the TCR, a TSC generates no harmonics and so requires no filtering. For this reason, some SVCs have been built with only TSCs . This can lead to a relatively cost-effective solution where the SVC only requires capacitive reactive power, although a disadvantage is that the reactive power output can only be varied in steps. Continuously variable reactive power output is only possible where the SVC contains a TCR or another variable element such as a STATCOM.

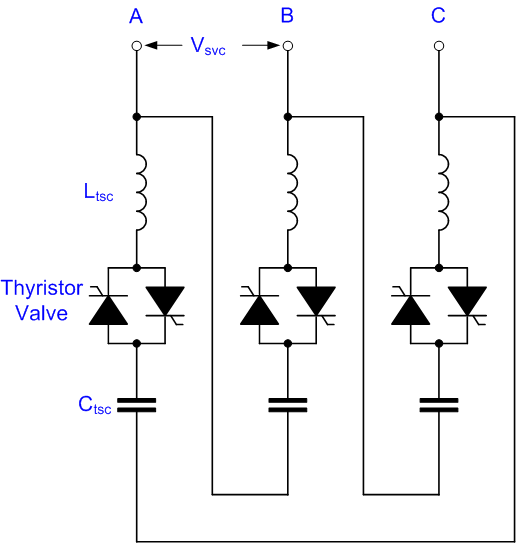

== Operating principles ==
Unlike the TCR, the TSC is only ever operated fully on or fully off. An attempt to operate a TSC in ‘’phase control’’ would result in the generation of very large amplitude resonant currents, leading to overheating of the capacitor bank and thyristor valve, and harmonic distortion in the AC system to which the SVC is connected.

=== Steady state current ===
When the TSC is on, or ‘’deblocked’’, the current leads the voltage 90° (as with any capacitor). The rms current is given by:

$I_{tsc} = {V_{svc}\over{ X_{tsc} }}$

Where:

$X_{tsc} = {{1 \over{2 \pi f C_{tsc}}}-2 \pi f L_{tsc} }$

V_{svc} is the rms value of the line-to-line busbar voltage to which the SVC is connected

C_{tsc} is the total TSC capacitance per phase

L_{tsc} is the total TSC inductance per phase

f is the frequency of the AC system

The TSC forms an inductor-capacitor (LC) resonant circuit with a characteristic frequency of :

$f_{tsc} = {{1 \over{2 \pi \sqrt{ C_{tsc} L_{tsc}}}}}$

The tuned frequency is usually chosen to be in the range 150-250 Hz on 60 Hz systems or 120-210 Hz on 50 Hz systems. It is an economic choice between the size of the TSC reactor (which increases with decreasing frequency) and the need to protect the thyristor valve from excessive oscillatory currents when the TSC is turned on at an incorrect point of wave (‘’misfiring’’).

The TSC is usually tuned to a non-integer harmonic of the mains frequency so as to avoid the risk of the TSC being overloaded by harmonic currents flowing into it from the AC system.

=== Off-state voltage ===
When the TSC is switched off, or ‘’blocked’’, no current flows and the voltage is supported by the thyristor valve. After the TSC has been switched off for a long time (hours) the capacitor will be fully discharged, and the thyristor valve will experience only the AC voltage of the SVC busbar. However, when the TSC turns off, it does so at zero current, corresponding to peak capacitor voltage. The capacitor only discharges very slowly, so the voltage experienced by the thyristor valve will reach a peak of more than twice the peak AC voltage, about half a cycle after blocking. The thyristor valve needs to contain enough thyristors in series to withstand this voltage safely.

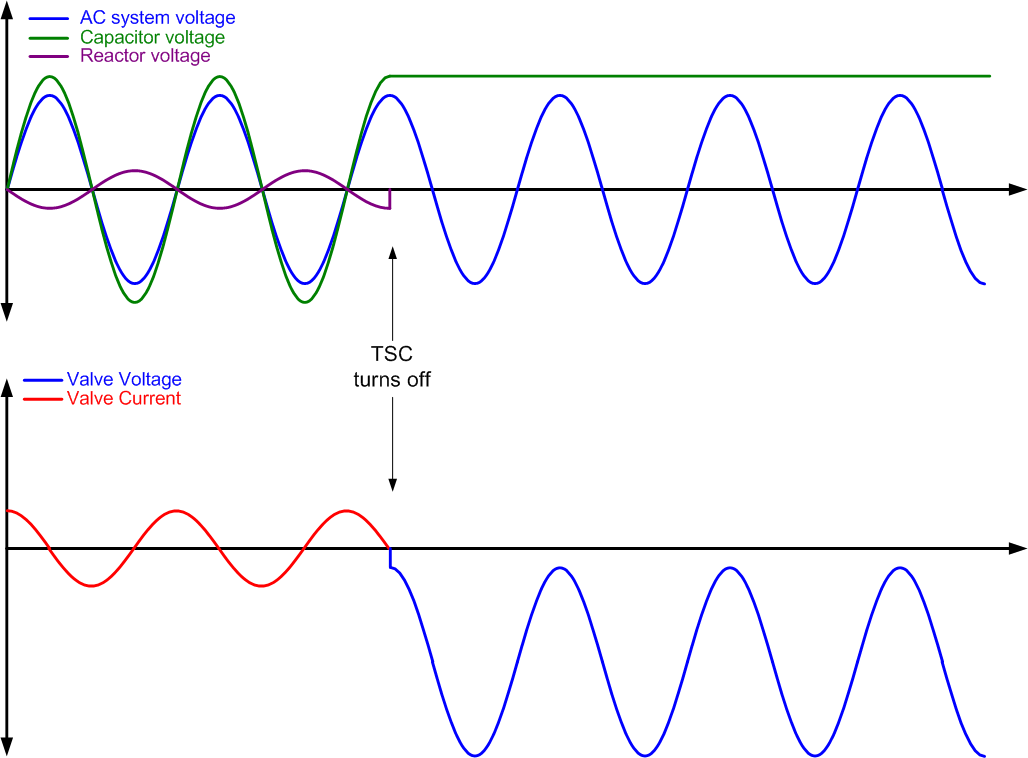

=== Deblocking – normal conditions ===
When the TSC is turned on ("deblocked") again, care must be taken to choose the correct instant in order to avoid creating very large oscillatory currents. Since the TSC is a resonant circuit, any sudden shock excitation will produce a high-frequency ringing effect which could damage the thyristor valve.

The optimum time to turn on a TSC is when the capacitor is still charged to its normal peak value and the turn-on command is sent at the minimum of valve voltage. If the TSC is deblocked at this point, the transition back into the conducting state will be smooth.

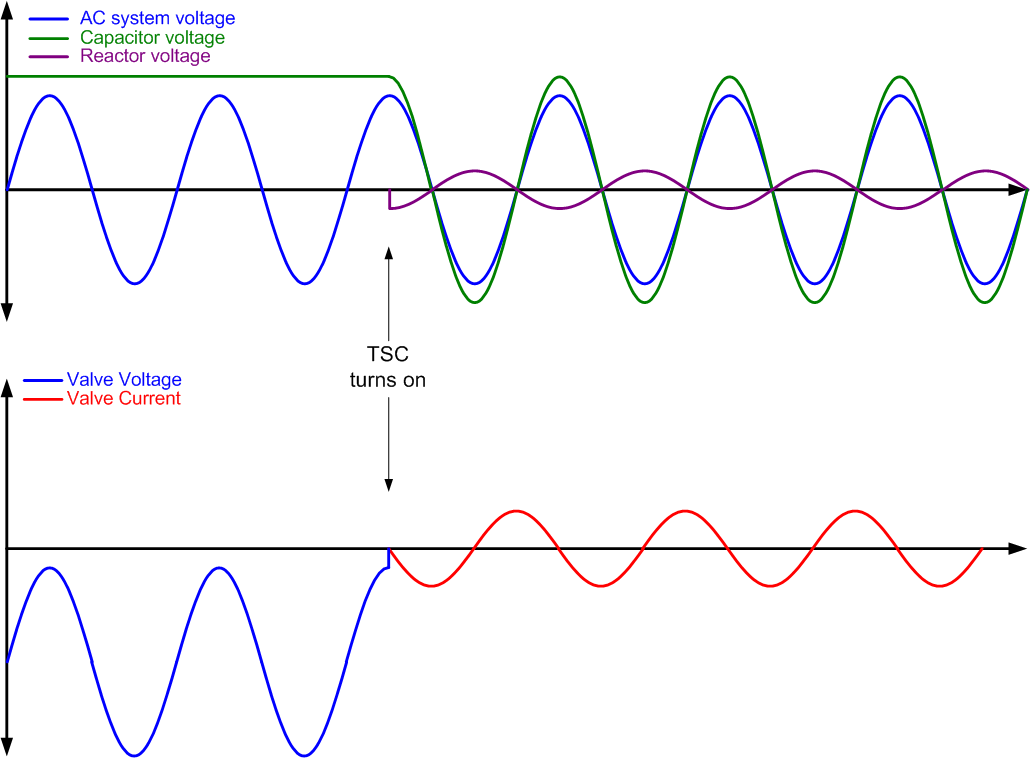

=== Deblocking – abnormal conditions ===
Sometimes, however, the TSC may turn on at an incorrect instant (as a result of a control or measurement fault), or the capacitor may become charged to a voltage above the normal value so that even at the minimum of valve voltage, a large transient current results. The current in the TSC will then consist of a fundamental-frequency component (50 Hz or 60 Hz) superimposed on a much larger current at the tuned frequency of the TSC. This transient current can take hundreds of milliseconds to die away, during which time the cumulative heating in the thyristors may be excessive.

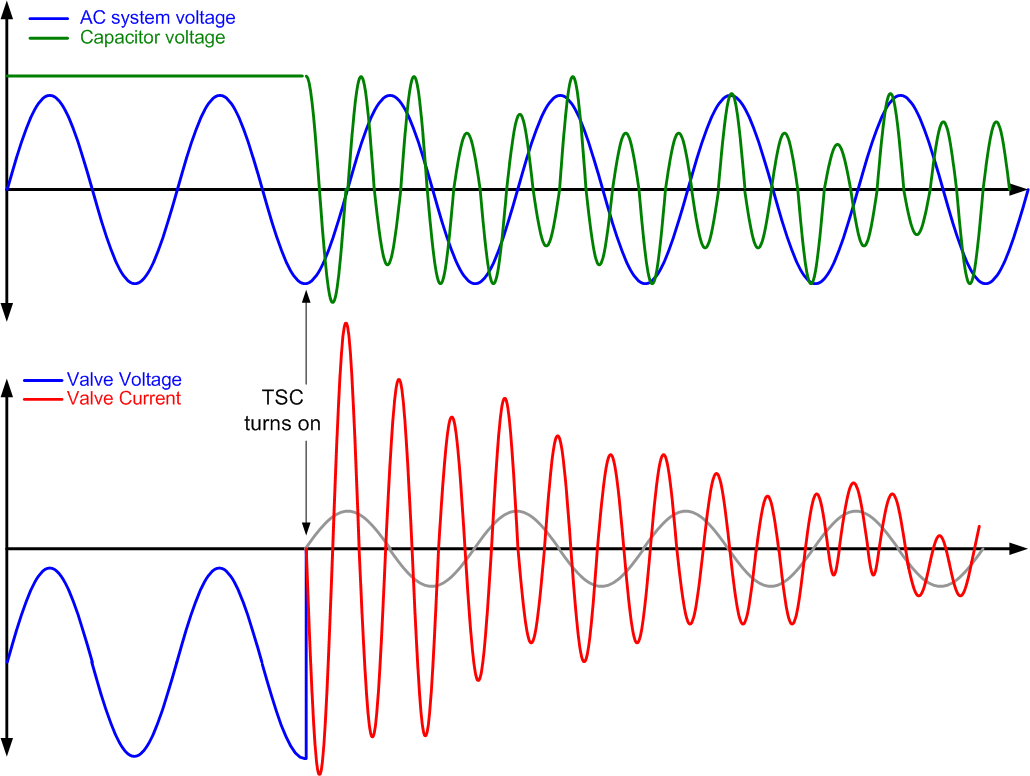

== Main equipment ==
A TSC normally comprises three main items of equipment: the main capacitor bank, the thyristor valve and a current-limiting reactor, which is usually air-cored.

=== Capacitor bank ===
The largest item of equipment in a TSC, the capacitor bank, is constructed from rack-mounted outdoor capacitor units, each unit typically having a rating in the range 500 – 1000 kilovars (kVAr).

=== TSC reactor ===
The function of the TSC reactor is to limit the peak current and rate of rise of current (di/dt) when the TSC turns on at an incorrect time. The reactor is usually an air-cored reactor, similar to that of a TCR, but smaller. The size and cost of the TSC reactor is heavily influenced by the tuning frequency of the TSC, lower frequencies requiring larger reactors.

The TSC reactor is usually located outside, close to the main capacitor bank.

=== Thyristor valve ===
The thyristor valve typically consists of 10-30 inverse-parallel-connected pairs of thyristors connected in series. The inverse-parallel connection is needed because most commercially available thyristors can conduct current in only one direction. The series connection is needed because the maximum voltage rating of commercially available thyristors (up to approximately 8.5 kV) is insufficient for the voltage at which the TCR is connected. For some low-voltage applications, it may be possible to avoid the series-connection of thyristors; in such cases the thyristor valve is simply an inverse-parallel connection of two thyristors.

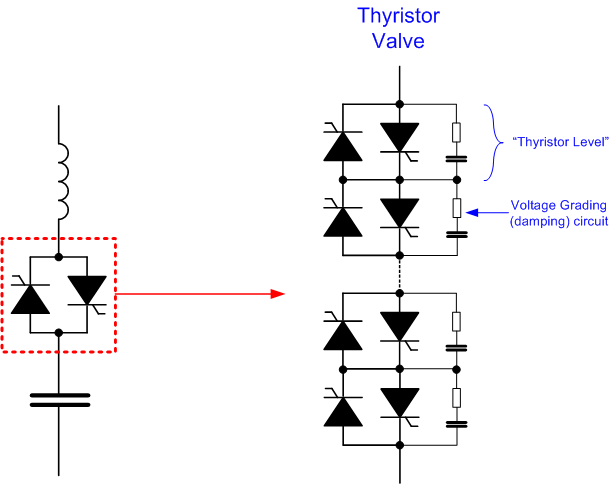
Typical TSC valve

In addition to the thyristors themselves, each inverse-parallel pair of thyristors has a resistor–capacitor ‘’snubber’ circuit connected across it, to force the voltage across the valve to divide uniformly amongst the thyristors and to damp the "commutation overshoot" which occurs when the valve turns off.

The thyristor valve for a TSC is very similar to that of a TCR, but (for a given AC voltage) generally has between 1.5 and 2 times as many thyristors connected in series because of the need to withstand both the AC voltage and the trapped capacitor voltage after blocking.

The thyristor valve is usually installed in a purpose-built, ventilated building, or a modified shipping container. Cooling for the thyristors and snubber resistors is usually provided by deionised water.

== Special types of TSC ==
Some TSCs have been built with the capacitor and inductor arranged not as a simple tuned LC circuit but rather as a damped filter. This type of arrangement is useful when the power system to which the TSC is connected contains significant levels of background harmonic distortion, or where there is a risk of resonance between the power system and the TSC.

In several “Relocatable SVCs” built for National Grid (Great Britain), three TSCs of unequal size were provided, in each case with the capacitor and inductor arranged as a “C-type” damped filter. In a C-type filter, the capacitor is split into two series-connected sections. A damping resistor is connected across one of the two capacitor sections and the inductor, the tuned frequency of this section being equal to the grid frequency. In this way, damping is provided for harmonic frequencies but the circuit incurs no power loss at grid frequency.

== See also ==
- Switched capacitor (SC)
