= Lightning arrester =

Device used on power lines to protect against sudden surges from lightning

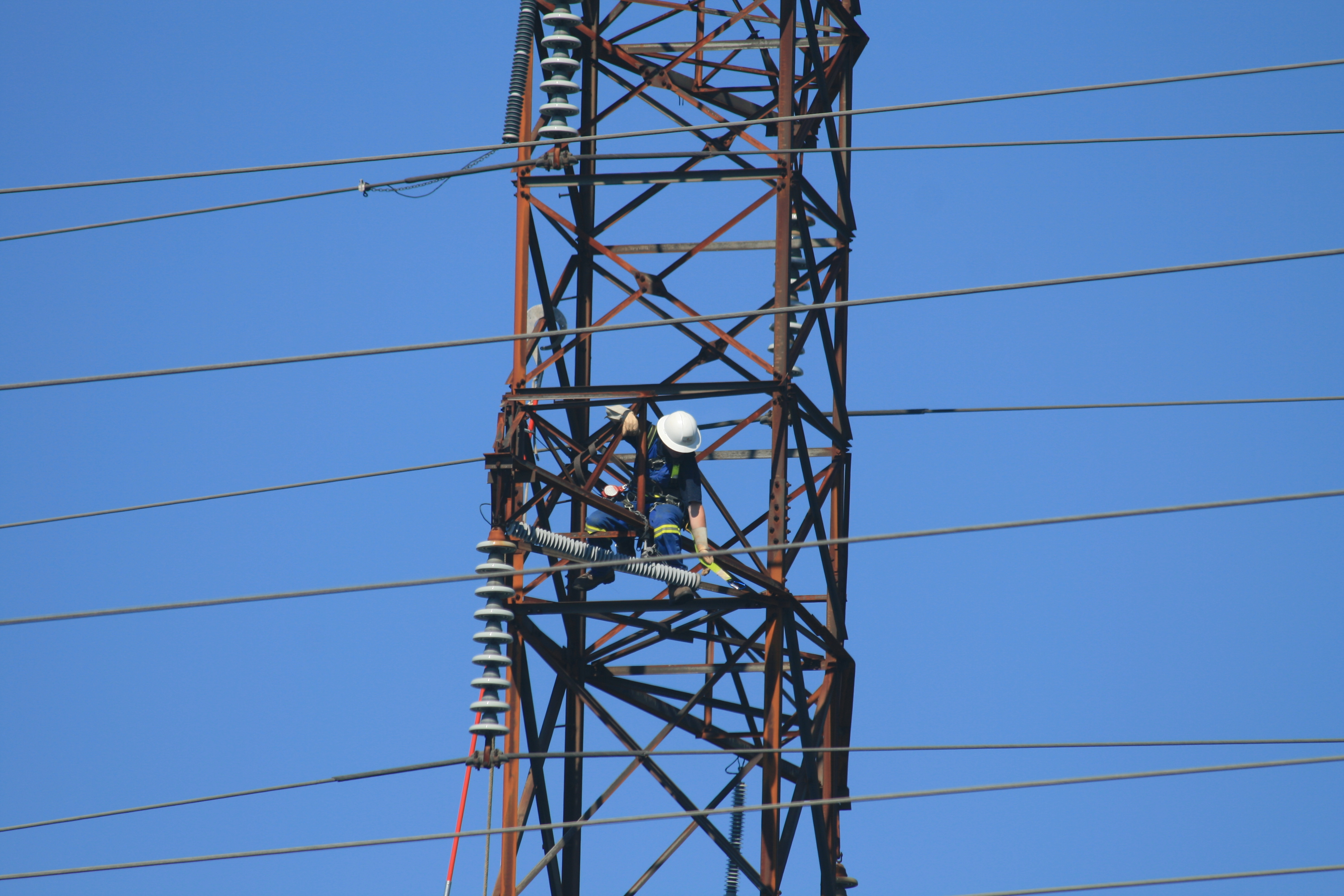
Powerline worker performs maintenance of a lightning arrester on an electrical transmission tower in New Brunswick, Canada

A lightning arrester (alternative spelling lightning arrestor) (also called lightning isolator) is a device used on electric power transmission and telecommunication systems to protect the insulation and conductors of the system from the damaging effects of lightning. The typical lightning arrester has a high-voltage terminal and a ground terminal. When a lightning surge (or switching surge, which is very similar) travels along the power line to the arrester, the current from the surge is diverted through the arrester, in most cases to earth.

In telegraphy and telephony, a lightning arrester is placed where wires enter a structure, preventing damage to electronic instruments within and ensuring the safety of individuals near them. Smaller versions of lightning arresters, called surge arresters, are devices that are connected between each conductor in power and communications systems and the earth. These prevent the flow of the normal power or signal currents to ground, but provide a path over which high-voltage lightning current flows, bypassing the connected equipment. Their purpose is to limit the rise in voltage when a communications or power line is struck by lightning or is near to a lightning strike.

If protection fails or is absent, lightning that strikes the electrical system introduces thousands of kilovolts that may damage the transmission lines, and can also cause severe damage to transformers and other electrical or electronic devices. Lightning-produced extreme voltage spikes in incoming power lines can damage electrical home appliances or even cause death.

Lightning arresters are used to protect electric fences. They consist of a spark gap and sometimes a series inductor. Such type of equipment is also used for protecting transmitters feeding a mast radiator. For such devices the series inductance has usually just one winding.

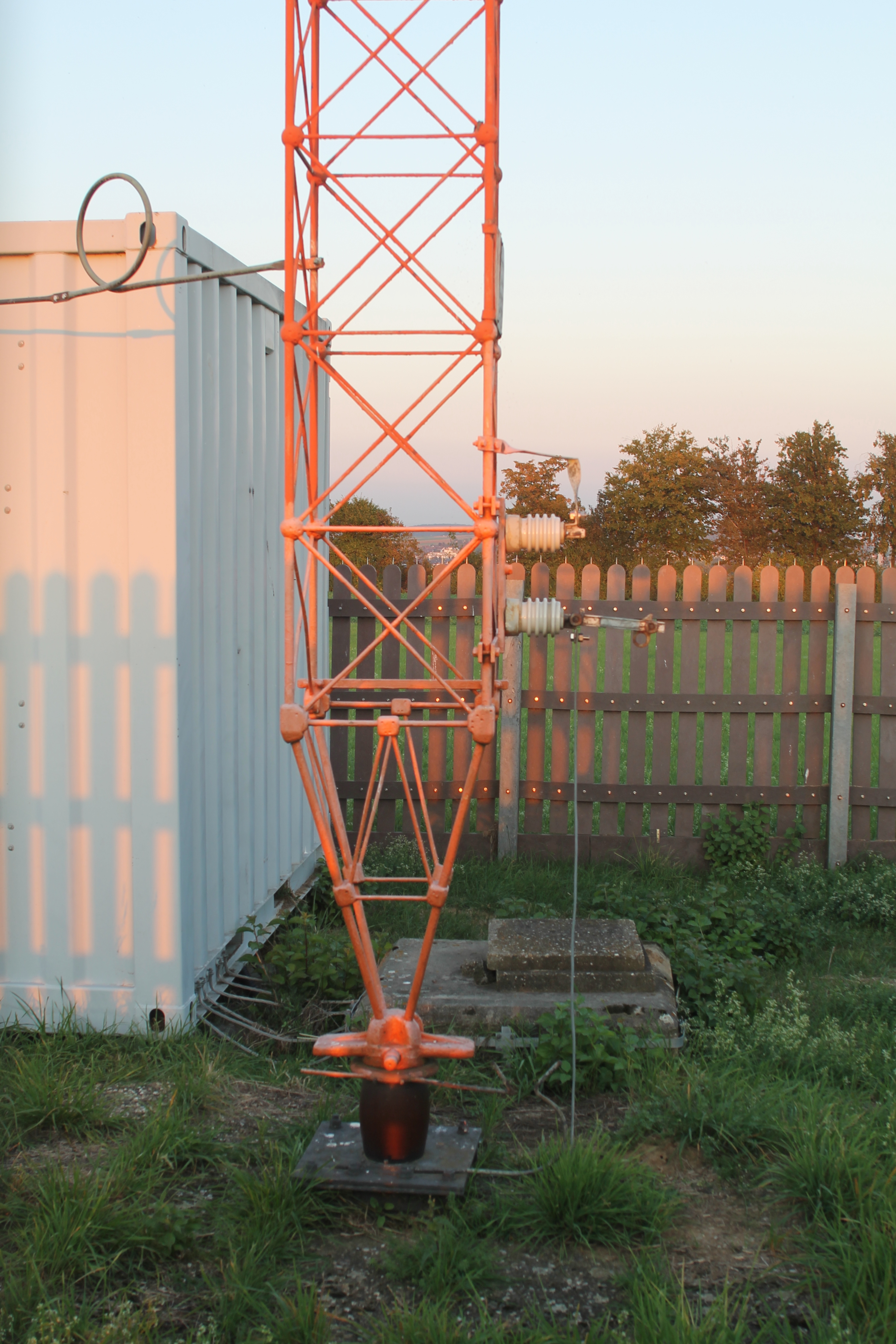
Base of a mast radiator with spark gap and series inductance in form of a coil with one winding in the feeder line

Lightning arresters can form part of large electrical transformers and can fragment during transformer ruptures. High-voltage transformer fire barriers are required to defeat ballistics from small arms as well as projectiles from transformer bushings and lightning arresters, per NFPA 850.

== Components ==
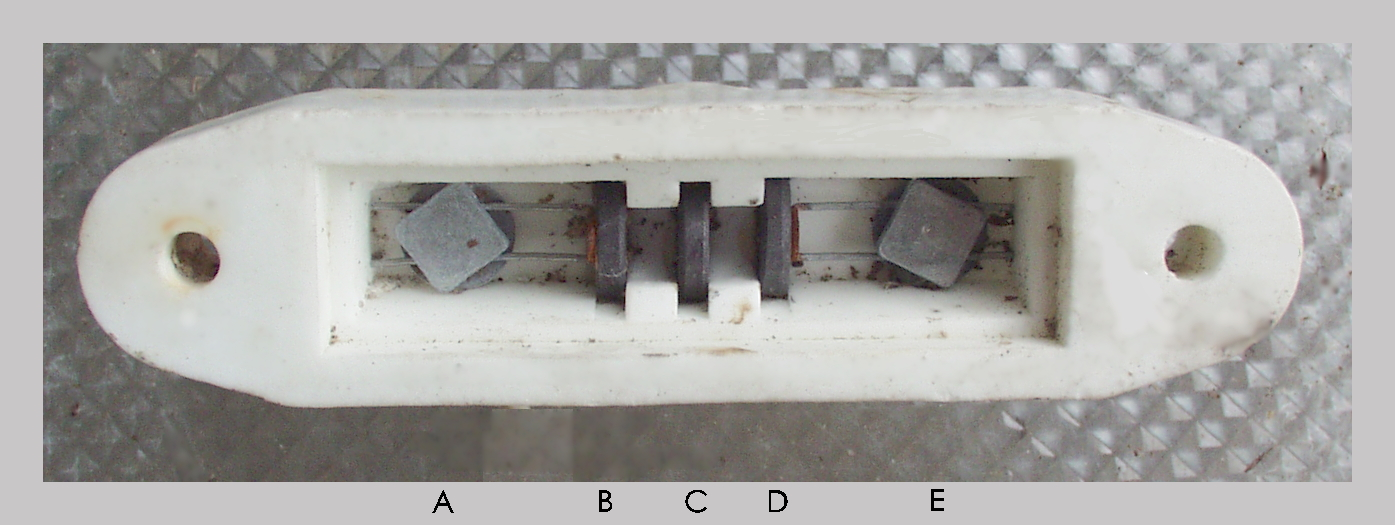
The antenna is attached to A, and a pipe in the ground is attached to E. The television signal can go from A to B but not from B to C or from C to D. However, when the high voltage of lightning hits, it can easily go through the air from B to C and from C to D and E.

A potential target for a lightning strike, such as an outdoor television antenna, is attached to the terminal labeled A in the photograph. Terminal E is attached to a long rod buried in the ground. Ordinarily no current will flow between the antenna and the ground because there is extremely high resistance between B and C, and also between C and D. The voltage of a lightning strike, however, is many times higher than that needed to move electrons through the two air gaps. The result is that electrons go through the lightning arresters rather than traveling on to the television set and destroying it.

A lightning arrester may be a spark gap or may have a block of a semiconducting material such as silicon carbide or zinc oxide. "Thyrite" was the trade name used by General Electric for the silicon carbide composite used in their arrester and varistor products. Some spark gaps are open to the air, but most modern varieties are filled with a precision gas mixture, and have a small amount of radioactive material to encourage the gas to ionize when the voltage across the gap reaches a specified level. Other designs of lightning arresters use a glow-discharge tube (essentially like a neon glow lamp) connected between the protected conductor and ground, or voltage-activated solid-state switches called varistors or MOVs.

Lightning arresters used in power substations are large devices, consisting of a porcelain tube several feet long and several inches in diameter, typically filled with discs of zinc oxide. A safety port on the side of the device vents the occasional internal explosion without shattering the porcelain cylinder.

Lightning arresters are rated by the peak current they can withstand, the amount of energy they can absorb, and the breakover voltage that they require to begin conduction. They are applied as part of a lightning protection system, in combination with air terminals and bonding.

== See also ==
- Lightning rod
- Surge arrester
- Thyristor switched capacitor
- Faraday cage
