= Bergeron diagram =

Evaluates signal reflection in transmission lines

A Bergeron diagram at time t=∞.

The Bergeron diagram method is a method to evaluate the effect of a reflection on an electrical signal. This graphic method—based on the real characteristic of the line—is valid for both linear and non-linear models and helps to calculate the delay of an electromagnetic signal on an electric transmission line.

Using the Bergeron method, on the I-V characteristic chart, start from the regime point before the transition, then move along a straight line with a slope of Z_{0} (Z_{0} is the line's characteristic impedance) to the new characteristic; then move along lines with −Z_{0} or +Z_{0} slope until the new regime situation is reached.

The − value is considered always the same at every reflection because the Bergeron method is used only for first reflections.

The method was originally developed by a French hydraulic engineer, L. J. B. Bergeron, for analysing water hammer effects in hydraulic systems.

== See also ==
- Ringing (signal)
- Signal reflection
