= Static synchronous series compensator =

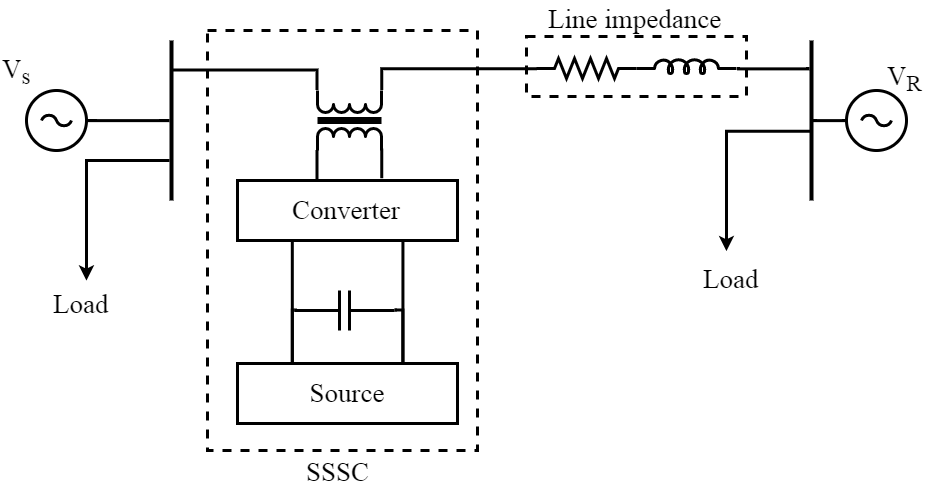
Static synchronous series compensator

A static synchronous series compensator (SSSC) is a type of flexible AC transmission system which consists of a solid-state voltage source inverter coupled with a transformer that is connected in series with a transmission line. This device can inject an almost sinusoidal voltage in series with the line. This injected voltage could be considered as an inductive or capacitive reactance, which is connected in series with the transmission line. This feature can provide controllable voltage compensation. In addition, SSSC is able to reverse the power flow by injecting a sufficiently large series reactive compensating voltage.

The SSSC consists of a voltage source converter (VSC) connected in series with the transmission line through a transformer. The VSC, a power electronic device, converts direct current (DC) power into alternating current (AC) power, enabling the injection of the desired voltage. By controlling the magnitude and phase angle of this injected voltage, the SSSC can effectively modify the line's impedance. One of the primary functions of the SSSC is to improve power flow control. By adjusting the line impedance, the SSSC can regulate the amount of power flowing through a specific transmission line. This is particularly useful for balancing power flows between different regions of a power system or for optimizing the utilization of existing transmission infrastructure.

Furthermore, the SSSC can enhance the stability of the power system by damping power oscillations. Power oscillations can occur due to disturbances such as sudden load changes or faults. The SSSC can quickly respond to these disturbances by injecting appropriate voltages, thereby stabilizing the system and preventing cascading failures.

In addition to power flow control and stability enhancement, the SSSC can also be used to improve voltage profile and mitigate voltage fluctuations. By injecting reactive power, the SSSC can regulate the voltage levels at various points in the power system, ensuring that they remain within acceptable limits. This is particularly important for maintaining the quality of power supply to consumers.

== See also ==
- Active power filter
- Static synchronous compensator (STATCOM), a similar shunt-connected device
- Unified power flow controller, a combination of SSSC and STATCOM
- Dynamic voltage restoration
