= EMTP =

EMTP is an acronym for Electromagnetic Transients Program. It is a software tool used by power systems engineers to analyse electromagnetic transients (generically "EMT") and associated insulation issues.

It is also a trademark for the commercial version of EMTP.

In 1964 in his Ph.D. thesis (Technical University of Munich), Dr. Hermann Dommel used Nodal analysis with the companion circuit model and the constant-parameter transmission line model, to simulate electromagnetic transients. The companion circuit model used the trapezoidal integration rule. At that time Bonneville Power Administration also started to develop a computer software for studying switching overvoltages for insulation coordination. In 1966, Hermann Dommel was invited to BPA from Germany to work on the development of a software named Electromagnetic Transients Program (EMTP). The EMTP development was part of a project for the development of load-flow and stability analysis software at BPA. This project was directed by W. F. Tinney whose fundamental contributions to the solution of sparse matrices enabled EMTP and other packages to simulate large power systems.

In 1973 H. Dommel left BPA to become a professor at University of British Columbia. The development of EMTP was then taken over and significantly accelerated by W. Scott Meyer. W. Scott Meyer collaborated with various researchers & experts including A. Ametani, Vladimir Brandwajn, Laurent Dubé, José R. Marti, Adam Semlyen. In 1981, the Development Coordination Group (DCG) of EMTP was proposed and formed by BPA in which Hermann Dommel maintained his participation. Over the following years, several organizations became members of DCG-EMTP to contribute research, development and field tests. The list included: ABB, AEP, CEA, CRIEPI, EDF, EPRI, Hydro-Québec, Ontario Hydro, US Bureau of Reclamation, Western Area Power Administration. EPRI joined the DCG in 1983.

In 1984 BPA left the DCG and W. Scott Meyer continued independently and personally developing with the existing EMTP code under the new name EMTP-ATP in his free time. ATP is acronym of Alternative Transients Program being non-commercial and royalty-free version of EMTP. EMTP-ATP was then in 1987 available in Europe distributed by Leuven EMTP Center at the KU Leuven (Katholieke Universiteit) as the first EMTP version running under MS-DOS on IBM XT/AT and compatible personal computers.

The DCG pursued the development of EMTP with its members. Several full versions were released on mainframe computers and later Unix workstations. The development work was continued mainly by Vladimir Brandwajn, Jean Mahseredjian and L. Marti. In 1992, J. Mahseredjian, then working at IREQ (Hydro-Québec) converted the EMTP code to work on OS/2, Windows 3.1 and Windows 3.11. The first Windows EMTP PC version was commercialized by Hydro One. In 1996 a major EMTP version was released on Windows 95. At that time it became acknowledged and urgent in the DCG to modernize the EMTP code and improve its numerical methods.

In 1996 J. Mahseredjian proposed to the DCG to abandon the old EMTP code and to rewrite it from scratch using modern programming languages, and latest numerical methods. His demonstrations and prototypes triggered the EMTP recoding (restructuring) project. The EMTP recoding project started in 1998 by J. Mahseredjian. J. Mahseredjian worked later with a small team of developers, including mainly S. Dennetière, O. Saad, C. Dewhurst and Laurent Dubé, to deliver the new commercial version of EMTP, in 2003. It was then released under the version named EMTP-RV, RV meaning restructured version. This new commercial EMTP code introduced several major improvements in graphical user interface, programming practices and numerical methods. In 2004, J. Mahseredjian left IREQ to become a professor at Polytechnique Montréal.

The DCG has been dismantled some time after the release of the new commercial version of EMTP. Currently the commercial version is controlled by EDF, Hydro-Québec and RTE. It is developed and maintained by the team of Jean Mahseredjian inside the PGSTech company.

Over the years, several researchers worldwide contributed numerical methods and models for EMT-type simulations tools. The fundamental concept of companion circuit model with trapezoidal integration triggered other major software developments. The EMT-type software named EMTDC/PSCAD is currently developed and maintained by Manitoba HVDC Research Center. The real-time simulation tool named RTDS is commercialized by RTDS Technologies Inc. Hydro-Québec also developed a real-time EMT solver named Hypersim. Hypersim is currently commercialized by Opal-RT Technologies Inc. PowerFactory – DIgSILENT has a full EMT-type simulation module. MathWorks commercializes a toolbox named Simscape Electrical which is based on the state-space approach for solving electrical circuits and benefits from the powerful control system simulation environment of Simulink.

== See also ==
- Distributed generation
- Nodal analysis
- Trapezoidal rule
- Transient (oscillation)
- Flexible AC transmission system (FACTS)
- Geomagnetically induced current (GIC)
- Power systems CAD
- Power system harmonics
