= Flexible AC transmission system =

Electrical equipment

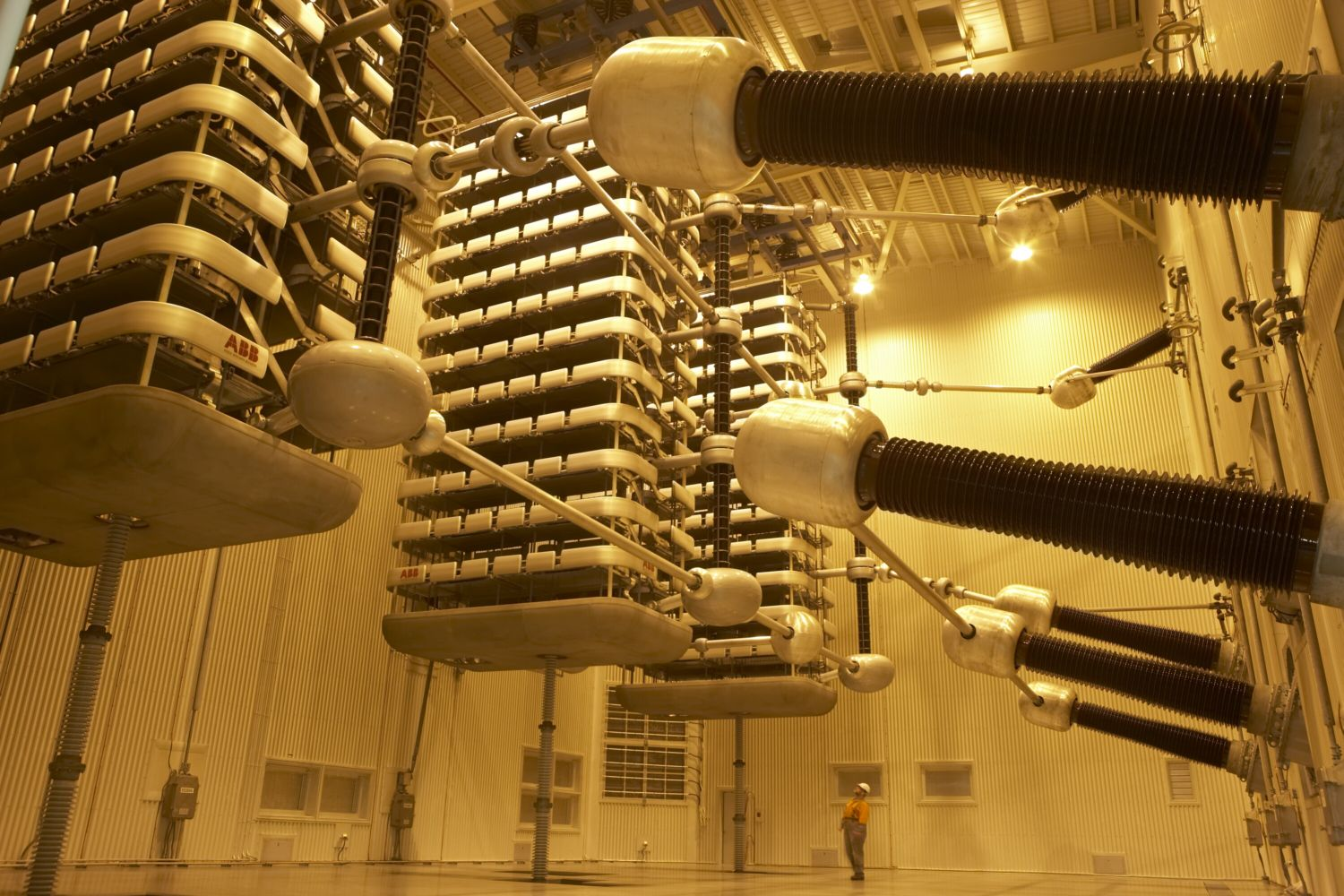
Pole 2 Thyristor Valve

In electrical engineering, a flexible alternating current transmission system (FACTS) is a family of power-electronic based devices designed for use on an alternating current (AC) transmission system to improve and control power flow and provide dynamic voltage support. FACTS devices are alternatives to traditional electric grid solutions and improvements, where building additional transmission lines or substation is not economically or logistically viable.

In general, FACTS devices improve power and voltage in three different ways: shunt compensation of voltage (replacing the function of capacitors or inductors), series compensation of impedance (replacing series capacitors) or phase-angle compensation (replacing generator droop-control or phase-shifting transformers). While other traditional equipment can accomplish all of this, FACTS devices use power electronics that are fast enough to switch sub-cycle opposed to seconds or minutes. Most FACTS devices are also dynamic and can support voltage across a range rather than just on and off, and are multi-quadrant, i.e. they can both supply and consume reactive power, and even sometimes real power. All of this give them their "flexible" nature and make them well-suited for applications with unknown or changing requirements.

The FACTs family initially grew out of the development of high-voltage direct current (HVDC) conversion and transmission, which used power electronics to convert AC to direct current (DC) to enable large, controllable power transfers. While HVDC focused on conversion to DC, FACTS devices used the developed technology to control power and voltage on the AC system. The most common type of FACTS device is the static VAR compensator (SVC), which uses thyristors to switch and control shunt capacitors and reactors, respectively.

== History ==
When AC won the war of the currents in the late 19th century, and electric grids began expanding and connecting cities and states, the need for reactive compensation became apparent. While AC offered benefits with transformation and reduced current, the alternating nature of voltage and current lead to additional challenges with the natural capacitance and inductance of transmission lines. Heavily loaded lines consumed reactive power due to the line's inductance, and as transmission voltage increased throughout the 20th century, the higher voltage supplied capacitive reactive power. As operating a transmission line only at it surge impedance loading (SIL) was not feasible, other means to manage the reactive power was needed.

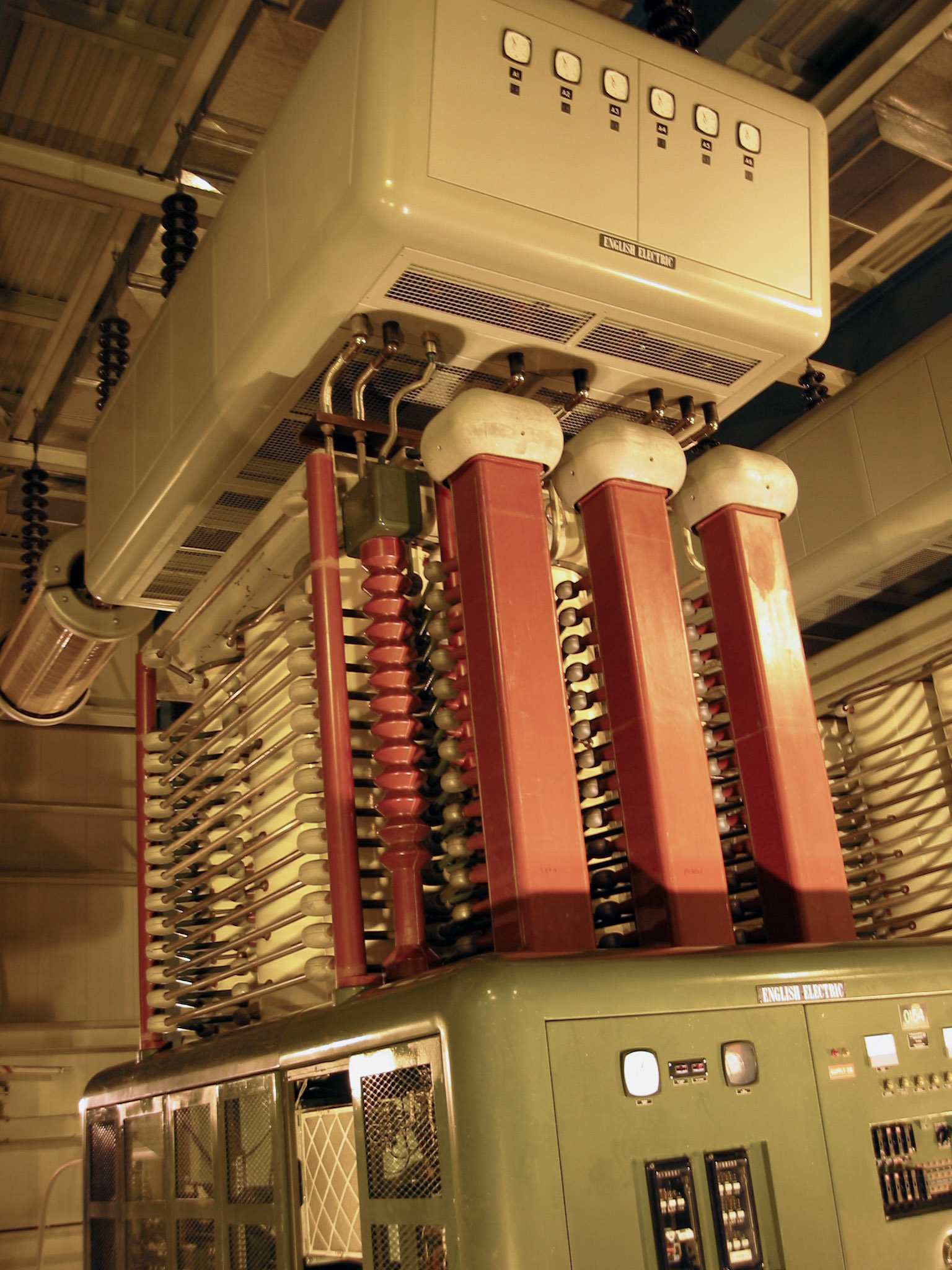
A mercury-arc Valve used for high-voltage power electronics.

Synchronous machines were commonly used at the time for generators, and could provide some reactive power support, however were limited due to the increase in losses it caused. They also became less effective as higher voltage transmissions lines moved loads further from sources. Fixed, shunt capacitor and reactor banks filled this need by being deployed where needed. In particular, shunt capacitors switched by circuit breakers provided an effective means to managing varying reactive power requirements due to changing loads. However, this was not without limitations.

Shunt capacitors and reactors are fixed devices, only able to be switched on and off. This required either a careful study of the exact size needed, or accepting less than ideal effects on the voltage of a transmission line. The need for a more dynamic and flexible solution was realized with the mercury-arc valve in the early 20th century. Similar to a vacuum tube, the mercury-arc valve was a high-powered rectifier, capable of converting high AC voltages to DC. As the technology improved, inverting became possible as well and mercury valves found use in power systems and HVDC ties. When connected to a reactor, different switching pattern could be used to vary the effective inductance connected, allow for more dynamic control. Arc valves continued to dominate power electronics until the rise of solid-state semiconductors in the mid 20th century.

As semiconductors replaced vacuum tubes, the thyristor created the first modern FACTs devices in the Static VAR Compensator (SVC). Effectively working as a circuit breaker that could switch on in milliseconds, it allowed for quickly switching capacitor banks. Connected to a reactor and switched sub-cycle allowed the effective inductance to be varied. The thyristor also greatly improved the control system, allowing an SVC to detect and react to faults to better support the system. The thyristor dominated the FACTs and HVDC world until the late 20th century, when the Insulated-Gate Bipolar Transistors (IGBT) began to match its power ratings.

== Theory ==
The basic theory for how FACTs devices affect the AC system is based on analyzing how power transfers between two points in an AC system. This is particularly relevant to how an AC electrical grid functions, as the grid has numerous nodes (substations) that lack sources (generators) or loads. Power flow must be calculated and controlled at each node (substation bus) to ensure the grid design and topology itself does not prevent generated electricity from reaching loads, as when Transmission Lines reach dozens to hundreds of miles in length, they add significant impedance and voltage drop to the system.

Given two buses, each with their own voltage magnitude and phase angle, and connected by a Transmission Line with an impedance, the current flowing between them is given by

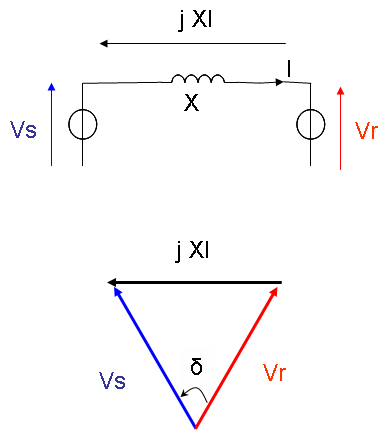
A simple Circuit Diagram showing two buses connected through an impedance, with a Vector Diagram representing the phase-angle between them

$\bar{I}=\frac{\bar{V}_s-\bar{V}_r}{\bar{Z}_L}$

Apparent Power flow, and thus real and reactive power, is then given by

$\bar{S} =\bar{V}\bar{I}^*=P+jQ$

Combining these two equations gives the real and reactive power flow as a function of voltages and impedance. This can be done relatively easily, and is done in load-flow and power analysis programs, but results in equations that are not intuitive to understand. Two approximations can be made to simplify things: assume a lossless Transmission Line (a decent assumption as very low resistance conductor is typically used) and neglecting any capacitance on the line (a fair assumption for 200kV lines and lower). This reduces the Line impedance to just a reactance, and results in the real and reactive power being

$P_s=P_r=P=\frac{V_sV_r}{X_L}\sin(\delta)$

$Q_s=-Q_r=Q=\frac{V_r}{X_L}[V_s\cos(\delta)-V_r]$

where

$V_s$ is the magnitude of the Sending-End Voltage, at the first bus

$V_r$ is the magnitude of the Receiving-End Voltage, at the second bus

$X_L$ is the reactance of the Transmission Line between the buses

$\delta$ is the phase angle difference between the sending-end and receiving end voltages

From the above equations, it can be seen that there are three variables that affect real and reactive power flow on a Transmission Line: the voltage magnitudes at either bus, the line reactance between the buses, and the voltage phase-angle difference between the buses. All FACTs devices operate on the fundamental principle that changing one or more of these variables will change the real and reactive power flow on the transmission line. Some FACTs devices will just change a single variable, while others will control all three.

It should be noted, and will be made more explicit below, that FACTs devices do not create or add real power to the system, they simply affect the circuit parameters between two points to affect how and when power flows.

== Types of FACTs devices ==
Given that FACTs device can change up to three parameters to affect power flow (voltage, impedance, and/or phase-angle), they are often categorized by what parameter they are controlling. As the conventional devices for controlling voltage (shunt capacitors and shunt inductors) and impedance (series capacitors and load-flow reactors) are so common, FACTs devices targeting voltage and impedance parameters are categorized as shunt and series devices, respectively.

=== Shunt Compensation Devices ===
The goal shunt compensation is to connect a device in parallel with the system that will improve voltage and enable larger power flow. This is traditionally done using shunt capacitors and inductors (reactors), much like Power Factor Correction.

The most common shunt compensation device is the Static VAR Compensator (SVC). SVCs use power electronics, generally Thyristors, to switch fixed capacitors and reactors. These are referred to as Thyristor Switched Capacitor (TSC) and Thyristor Switched Reactor (TSR), respectively. Thyristors are fast enough that they can be switched sub-cycle, and can switch a reactor at different points each cycle to control the vars the reactor produces. When arranged to do this, the TSR is referred to as a Thyristor Controlled Reactor (TCR). TCRs produce large amounts of harmonics and require Filter Banks to prevent adverse effects to the system.

Another type of shunt compensation is the Static Synchronous Compensator or STATCOM. Power electronics are combined in series with a reactor to form a Voltage-Sourced Converter (VSC), which when connected to an AC system forms a STATCOM. A VSC use the same principal of power flow on a transmission line; measuring the system voltage its connected to and varying the voltage of the power electronics to cause reactive power flow in or out of the VSC. Early STATCOMs used thyristors as their power electronics and Pulse-Width Modulation (PWM) to control reactive power, but with advances in semiconductor technologies, Insulated-Gate Bipolar Transistors (IGBT) have replaced them. Modern E – STATCOMs can not only provide reactive power service but also active power related services as it is embedded with a battery or super capacitor energy storage.

=== Series Compensation Devices ===
Series Compensation devices change the impedance of the Transmission Line to increase or decrease power flow. Power flow is increased by adding a series capacitor to offset line inductance or decreased by adding a series load-flow reactor to add to the line inductance.

One type of series compensation is the Thyristor-Series Capacitor (TSC), which combines the TCR from an SVC in parallel with a traditional fixed series capacitor. As using power electronics to switch capacitors sub-cycle is not feasible due to concerns of stored charge, a TCR is used to create a variable inductance to offset the capacitor. A TCSC can be used to dynamically vary the power flow on a transmission line.

A VSC can also be used as a series compensation device if it's connected across the secondary winding of a series-connected transformer. This arrangement is referred to as a Static Synchronous Series Compensator (SSSC), and offers the benefits of a smaller reactor than in a TCSC, and the lower harmonic production of a VSC (or Voltage-Source Inverter – VSI when used in a SSSC) compared to a TCR.

=== Phase Angle Compensation ===
Power will only flow between two points on an AC system if there is a phase angle difference between the buses. Traditionally this is controlled by generators, however in large grids this becomes ineffective for managing power flow between distant buses. Phase-Shifting Transformers (PST) are generally used for these applications and can just be a Phase-Angle Regulator (PAR) or control both phase-angle and voltage.

The most straightforward phase angle compensation device would be to replace the tap changer on PAR with thyristors to switch portions of the winding in and out, forming a Thyristor-Controlled Phase-Shifting Transformer (TCPST). However, this is generally not done as a TCPST would be considerably more expensive than a PAR. Instead, this idea is expanded to replace a Quadrature Booster with a device referred to as a Thyristor-Controlled Phase-Angle Regulator (TCPAR), also known as a Static Phase-Shifter (SPS). From the schematic, it can be seen that a TCPAR is just a Quadrature Booster with the mechanical portions of the excitor and booster transformers replaced with Power Electronics, typically Thyristors.

Another way to form a TCPAR is to separate the Excitor and Booster transformer and control their secondaries with separate sets of Power Electronics. By linking the two sets of Power Electronics through a DC bus, typically by using GTO Thyristors or IGBTs, a TCPAR can be formed. While doing this may initially seem unnecessary, by looking at the shunt and series transformers and their electronics separately, it is apparent that the shunt portion is a STATCOM, and the series portion is a SSSC. With the DC bus providing power from the shunt portion to the series portion, the device functions as a Phase-Angle regulator, however with the DC bus isolating the two side, the STATCOM can control the shunt voltage or the SSSC can control line impedance. This gives the device its name, the Unified Power Flow Controller (UPFC), as it can control all three parameters that affect Power Control.

== See also ==
- Static VAR Compensator (SVC)
- Static Synchronous Compensator (STATCOM)
- Thyristor-Controlled Series Capacitor (TCSC)
- Static Synchronous Series Compensator (SSSC)
- Thyristor-Controlled Phase Angle Regulator (TCPAR)
- Unified Power Flow Controller (UPFC)
- High-Voltage DC (HVDC)
- Common Smart Inverter Profile
