= Hermann W. Dommel =

German inventor (1933–2025)

University portrait of Dommel c.1995

Hermann W. Dommel (December 13, 1933 – July 14, 2025) was a German inventor who received his Diplom Ingenieur in 1959 and Doktoringenieur in 1962, in Electrical engineering, from the Technical University of Munich. "In the 1960s he pioneered the foundation for the electromagnetic transients program, (EMTP) software that has become an indispensable tool in the power industry", according to the IEEE, winning him in 2013 the IEEE Medal in Power Engineering. From 1973, he worked with the University of British Columbia in Vancouver, British Columbia, Canada, where he was Professor Emeritus.

Dommel started his career in 1973 at the University after having worked for Bonneville Power Administration in Portland, Oregon, USA where he was involved in developing several computer programs, including what is now known as the EMTP. He has imparted his knowledge on electromagnetic transients through short courses that he has taught at utilities and universities globally. His contributions to the field have been recognized with his appointment as a Life Fellow of IEEE. Additionally, he held the Industrial Research Chair, which was sponsored by B.C. Hydro and the Natural Sciences and Engineering Research Council of Canada, from 1995 to 2000.

== Background ==
Born in Germany in 1933, Hermann earned his Dipl.Ing. and Dr.Ing. degrees in electrical engineering from the Technical University of Munich in 1959 and 1962, respectively. He worked with the Technical University of Munich from 1959 to 1966 and with Bonneville Power Administration in Portland, OR, USA from 1966 to 1973. He was a Professor Emeritus at the University of British Columbia in Vancouver, BC, Canada.

His research interests include synchronous machine, EMTP, Fourier series, Laplace transform, frequency-domain analysis, magnetic flux, transmission lines, power electronics, and power system transient.

Dommel died in 2025.
