= Static synchronous compensator =

Regulating device used on transmission networks

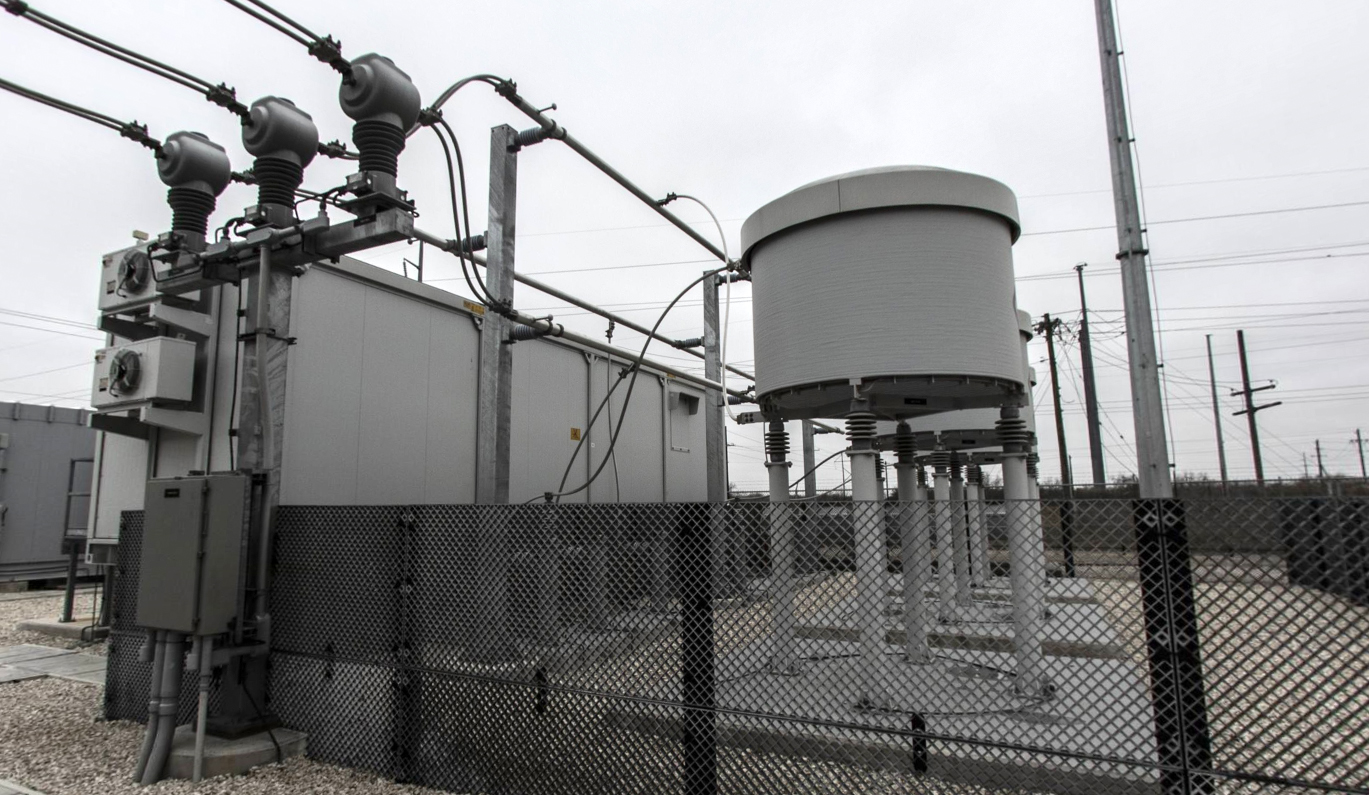
A STATCOM located in an electrical substation

In electrical engineering , a static synchronous compensator (STATCOM) is a shunt-connected, reactive compensation device used on transmission networks. It uses power electronics to form a voltage-source converter that can act as either a source or sink of reactive AC power to an electricity network. It is a member of the flexible AC transmission system (FACTS) family of devices.

STATCOMS are alternatives to other passive reactive power devices, such as capacitors and inductors (reactors). They have a variable reactive power output, can change their output in terms of milliseconds, and are able to supply and consume both capacitive and inductive vars. While they can be used for voltage support and power factor correction, their speed and capability are better suited for dynamic situations like supporting the grid under fault conditions or contingency events.

The use of voltage-source based FACTs device had been desirable for some time, as it helps mitigate the limitations of current-source based devices whose reactive output decreases with system voltage. However, limitations in technology have historically prevented wide adoption of STATCOMs. When gate turn-off thyristors (GTO) became more widely available in the 1990s and had the ability to switch both on and off at higher power levels, the first STATCOMs began to be commercially available. These devices typically used 3-level topologies and pulse-width modulation (PWM) to simulate voltage waveforms.

Modern STATCOMs now make use of insulated-gate bipolar transistors (IGBTs), which allow for faster switching at high-power levels. 3-level topologies have begun to give way to Multi-Modular Converter (MMC) Topologies, which allow for more levels in the voltage waveform, reducing harmonics and improving performance.

== History ==
When AC won the War of Currents in the late 19th century, and electric grids began expanding and connecting cities and states, the need for reactive compensation became apparent. While AC offered benefits with transformation and reduced current, the alternating nature of voltage and current lead to additional challenges with the natural capacitance and inductance of transmission lines. Heavily loaded lines consumed reactive power due to the line's inductance, and as transmission voltage increased throughout the 20th century, the higher voltage supplied capacitive reactive power. As operating a transmission line only at it surge impedance loading (SIL) was not feasible, other means to manage the reactive power was needed.

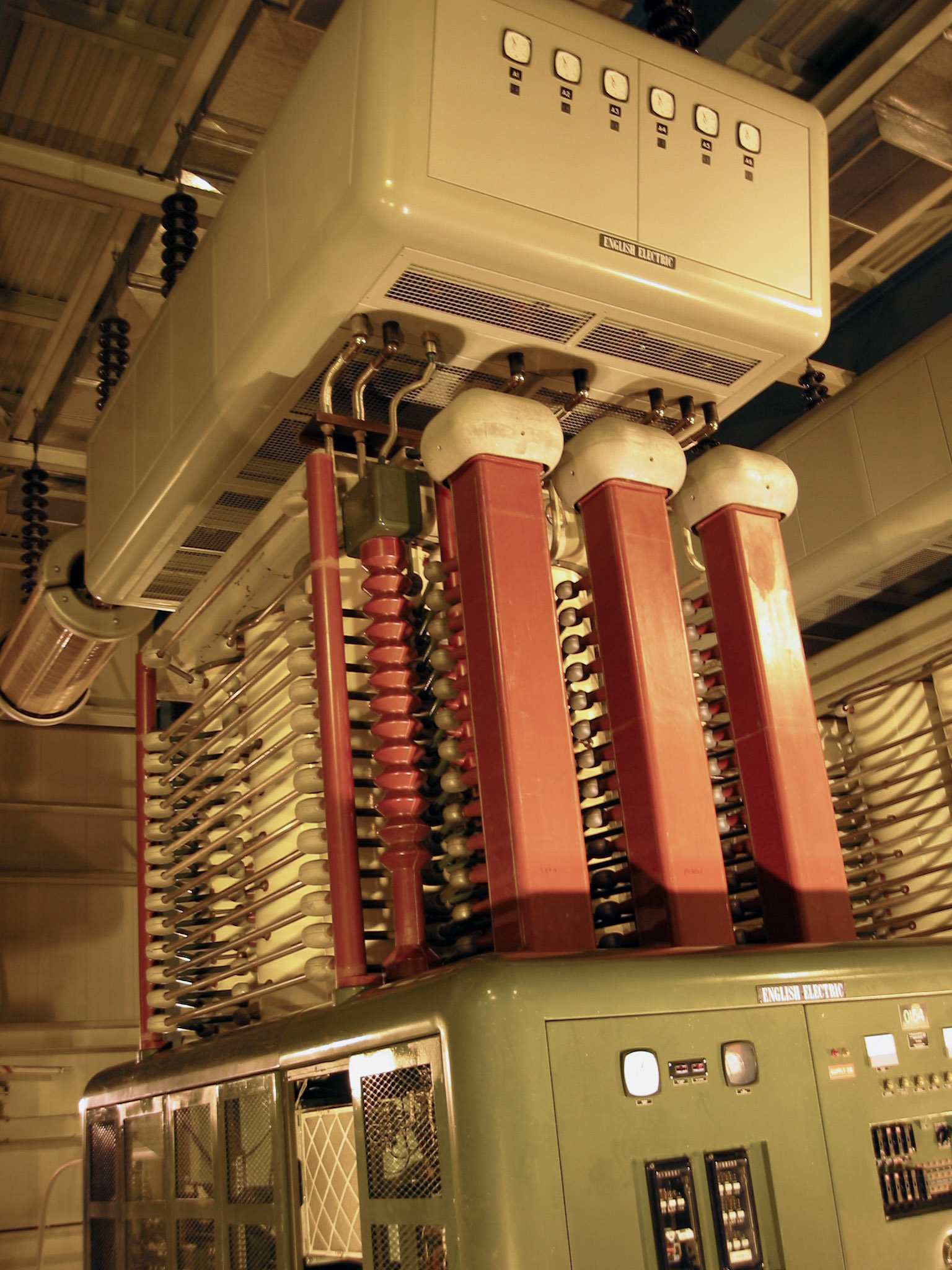
A mercury-arc valve used for high-voltage power electronics

Synchronous Machines were commonly used at the time for generators, and could provide some reactive power support, however were limited due to the increase in losses it caused. They also became less effective as higher voltage transmissions lines moved loads further from sources. Fixed, shunt capacitor and reactor banks filled this need by being deployed where needed. In particular, shunt capacitors switched by circuit breakers provided an effective means to managing varying reactive power requirements due to changing loads. However, this was not without limitations.

Shunt capacitors and reactors are fixed devices, only able to be switched on and off. This required either a careful study of the exact size needed, or accepting less than ideal effects on the voltage of a transmission line. The need for a more dynamic and flexible solution was realized with the mercury-arc valve in the early 20th century. Similar to a vacuum tube, the mercury-arc valve was a high-powered rectifier, capable of converting high AC voltages to DC. As the technology improved, inverting became possible as well and mercury valves found use in power systems and HVDC ties. When connected to a reactor, different switching pattern could be used to vary the effective inductance connected, allow for more dynamic control. Arc valves continued to dominate power electronics until the rise of solid-state semiconductors in the mid 20th century.

As semiconductors replaced vacuum tubes, the thyristor created the first modern FACTs devices in the Static VAR Compensator (SVC). Effectively working as a circuit breaker that could switch on in milliseconds, it allowed for quickly switching capacitor banks. Connected to a reactor and switched sub-cycle allowed the effective inductance to be varied. The thyristor also greatly improved the control system, allowing an SVC to detect and react to faults to better support the system. The thyristor dominated the FACTs and HVDC world until the late 20th century, when the IGBT began to match its power ratings.

With the IGBT, the first voltage-sourced converters and STATCOMs began to enter the FACTs world. A prototype 1 MVAr STATCOM was described in a report by Empire State Electric Energy Research Corporation in 1987. The first production 100 MVAr STATCOM made by Westinghouse Electric was installed at the Tennessee Valley Authority Sullivan substation in 1995 but was quickly retired due to obsolescence of its components.

== Theory ==
The basis of a STATCOM is a voltage source converter (VSC) connected in series with some type of reactance, either a fixed inductor or a power transformer. This allows a STATCOM to control power flow much like a transmission line, albeit without any active (real) power flow. Given an inductor connected between two AC voltages, the reactive power flow between the two points is given by:

A STATCOM consisting of a VSC (bottom) and a fixed inductor (top). The inductor is connected on the other side to an AC system.

$Q=\frac{V_S\cdot(\Delta V)}{X}\cos(\delta)$

where

$Q$: Reactive Power

$V_S$: Sending-End Voltage

$\Delta V$: Magnitude difference in $V_S$ and receiving end voltage $V_R$

$X$: Reactance of the Inductor or transformer

$\delta$: Phase-Angle difference between $V_S$ and $V_R$

With $\delta$ close to zero (as the STATCOM provides no real power and only consumes a small amount as losses) and $X$ a fixed size, reactive power flow is controlled by the difference in magnitude of the two AC voltages. From the equation, if the STATCOM creates a voltage magnitude greater than the system voltage, it supplies capacitive reactive power to the system. If the STATCOM's voltage magnitude is less, it consumes inductive reactive power from the system. As most modern VSCs are made of power electronics that are capable of making small voltage changes very quickly, a dynamic reactive power output is possible. This compares to a traditional, fixed capacitor or inductor, that is either off (0 MVar) or at its maximum (for example, 50 MVar). A similarly sized STATCOM would range from 50 MVar capacitive to 50 MVar inductive, in as small as 1 MVar steps.

== VSC topologies ==
Since a STATCOM varies its voltage magnitude to control reactive power, the topology of how the VSC is designed and connected defines how effectively and quickly it can operate. There are numerous different topologies available for VSCs and power electronic based converters, the most common ones are covered below. IGBTS are listed as the power electronics device below, however older devices also used GTO Thyristors.

=== Two-level converter ===
Single phase of a three-phase bridge rectifier, showing 2 levels possible. Bottom right shows the switch equivalent of the IGBT operation.

One of the earliest VSC topologies was the two-level converter, adapted from the three-phase bridge rectifier. Also referred to as a 6-pulse rectifier, it is able to connect the AC voltage through different IGBT paths based on switching. When used as a rectifier to convert AC to DC, this allows both the positive and negative portion of the waveform to be converted to DC. When used in a VSC for a STATCOM, a capacitor can be connected across the DC side to produce a square wave with two levels.

This alone offers no real advantages for a STATCOM, as the voltage magnitude is fixed. However, if the IGBTs can be switched fast enough, pulse-width modulation (PWM) can be used to control the voltage magnitude. By varying the durations of the pulses, the effective magnitude of the voltage waveform can be controlled. Since PWM still only produces square waves, harmonic generation is quite significant. Some harmonic reduction can be achieved by analytical techniques on different switching patterns; however, this is limited to controller complexity. Each level of the two-level converter also generally comprises multiple series IGBTs, to create the needed final voltage, so coordination and timing between individual devices is challenging.

=== Three-level converter ===
Single phase of a three-level converter topology. Bottom right shows the switch equivalent of the IGBT operation.

Adding additional levels to a converter topology has the benefit of more closely mirroring a true voltage sine wave, which reduces harmonic generation and improves performance. If all three phases of a VSC utilize its own two-level converter topology, the phase-to-phase voltage will be three levels (as while the three phase have the same switching pattern, they are shifted in time relative to each other). This allows a positive and negative peak in addition to a zero level, which adds positive and negative symmetry and eliminates even order harmonics. Another option is to enhance the two-level topology to a three-level converter.

By adding two additional IGBTs to the converter, three different levels can be created by have two IGBTs on at once. If each phase has its own three-level converter, then a total of five levels can be created. This creates a very crude sine wave, however PWM still offer less harmonic generation (as the pulses are still on all five levels).

Three-level converters can also be combined with transformers and phase shifting to create additional levels. A transformer with two secondaries, one Wye-Wye and the other Wye-Delta, can be connected to two separate three-phase, three-level converters to double the number of levels. Additional phase-shifted windings can be used to turn the traditional 6 pulses of a three-level to 12, 24, or even 48 pulses. With this many pulses and levels, the waveform better approximates a true sine wave, and all harmonics generated are of a much higher order that can be filtered out with a low-pass filter.

=== Modular multi-level converter ===
MMC topology for a single phase, with a DC bus. The diagram shows switches, which would be replaced with some type of IGBT arrangement in a VSC.

While adding phase shifting to three-level converters improves harmonic performance, it comes at the cost of adding 2, 3 or even 4 additional STATCOMs. It also adds little to no redundancy, as the switching pattern is too complex to accommodate the loss of one STATCOM. As the idea of the three-level converter is to add additional levels to better approximate a voltage sine wave, another topology called the Modular Multi-level Converter (MMC) offers some benefits.

The MMC topology is similar to the three-level in that switching on various IGBTs will connect different capacitors to the circuit. As each IGBT "switch" has its own capacitor, voltage can be built up in discrete steps. Adding additional levels increases the number of steps, better approximating a sine wave. With enough levels, PWM is not necessary as the waveform created is close enough to a true voltage sine wave and generates very little harmonics.

The IGBT arrangement around the capacitor for each step depends on the DC needs. If a DC bus is needed (for an HVDC tie or a STATCOM with synthetic inertia) then only two IGBTs are needed per capacitor level. If a DC bus is not needed, and there are benefits to connecting the three phases into a delta arrangement to eliminate zero sequence harmonics, four IGBTs can be used to surround the capacitor to bypass or switch it in at either polarity.

== Operation ==
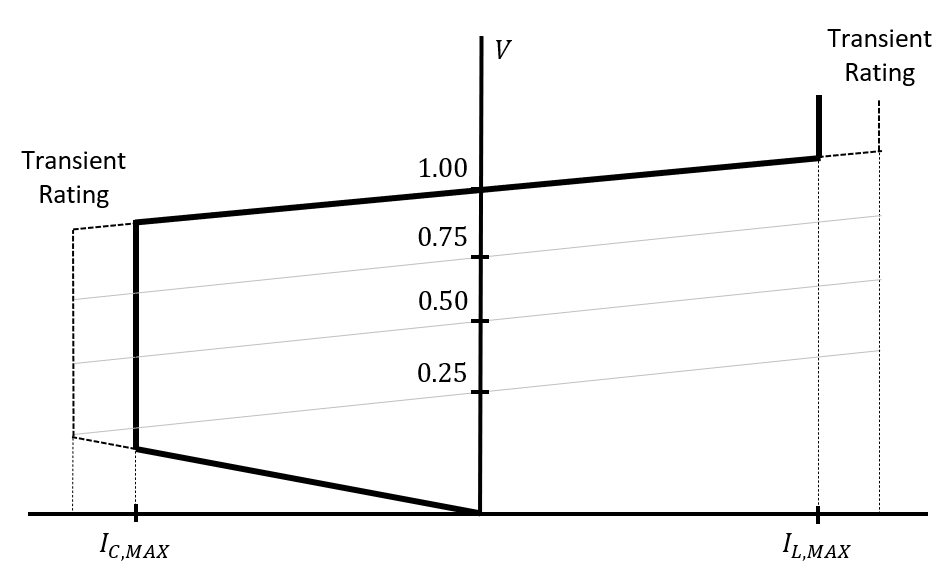
The VI characteristics of typical STATCOM

As a STATCOM's VSC operation is based on changing reactive current flow to affect voltage, its voltage-current (VI) characteristics control how it operates. The VI characteristic can be divided into two distinct parts: the region at either capacitive or inductive maximum and the region between the maximums.

When operating at either of its maximums, the STATCOM is said to be in a VAR control mode, where it's supplying or consuming its maximum reactive output. Unlike a traditional SVC, whose capacitive output is linearly dependent on voltage, a STATCOM can supply its maximum capacitive rating for any voltage. While technically capable of responding to near zero voltage magnitudes, a STATCOM is typically set to ride through voltage drops up to around 0.2 pu. A STATCOM may also have a transient rating, where it can provide above its maximum current for very short time, allowing it to help the system better for larger faults. This rating depends on the specific design but can be as high as 3.0 pu.

While in the region between its maximums, the STATCOM is said to be in a voltage regulation mode, where it either supplies or consumes reactive current under its maximum capability, with the goal of regulating the system voltage. A key parameter of the voltage regulator mode is the regulator slope, which functions similar to a generator's droop speed control, and effectively sets an allowable voltage difference the STATCOM will tolerate, but based on its current output. The slope is often specified as a percentage, and represents the maximum voltage difference allowed, or vdroop. For example, a slope of 2% would allow a 2% vdroop from the STATCOM's set point when at maximum reactive output. To control this, the voltage regulator mode of the STATCOM uses a closed loop, PID regulator to feedback the reactive current of the STATCOM to control system voltage. A simplified PID regulator is shown below, where the system voltage is compared to a desired reference voltage, and combining the reactive current of the VSC and the regulator slope. Through this feedback, the dynamic capability of the STATCOM can be reserved.

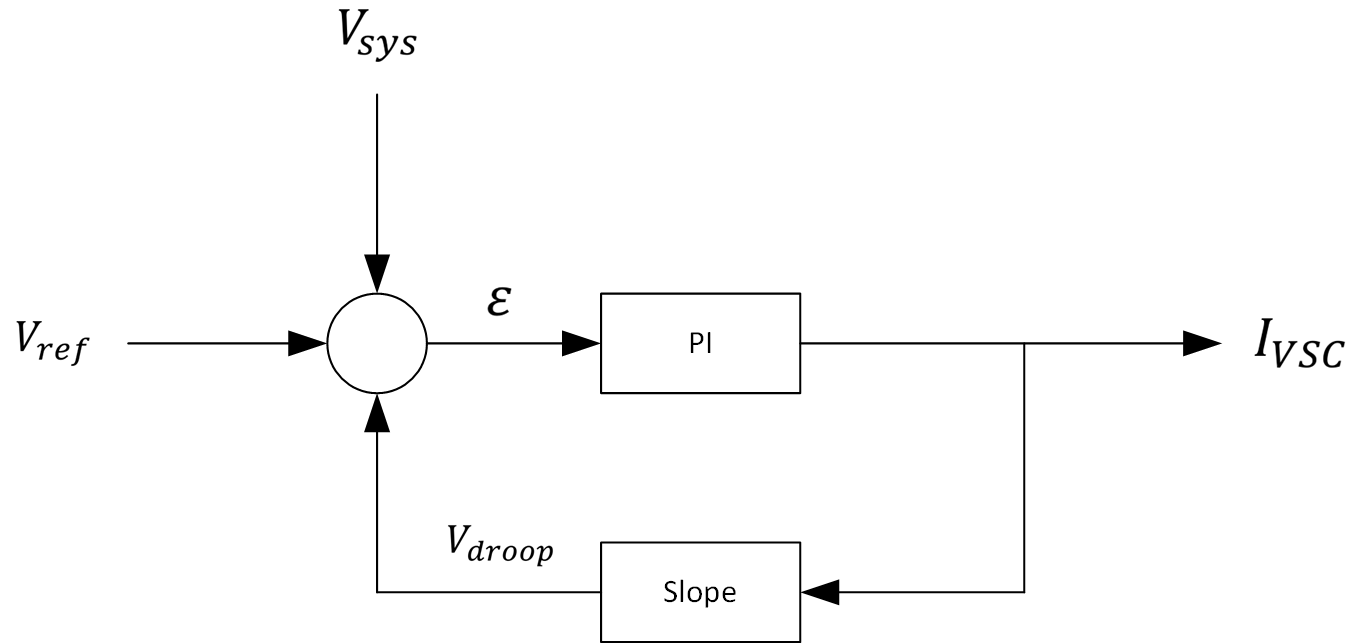
A simplified PID regulator used in the voltage regulation control mode of a STATCOM

For example, consider a STATCOM with a regulation slope of 2% and a reference voltage of 1.00 pu. With a system voltage drop to 0.99 pu, the STATCOM's response will depend on its current reactive output. If the STATCOM's output is near zero, the feedback of the VSC current will have little to no impact on the comparison of the system and reference voltage, as at zero reactive output the regulation slope line is at the voltage reference. However, if the STATCOM is at 70% of its capability, the regulation slope allows for a vdroop of 1.4%. As 0.99 pu is only 1% different from the reference voltage, the feedback of the VSC current through the regulation slope will reduce the total error, and thus the response of the STATCOM. This is the basis for the voltage regulation operation mode: if a 2% voltage difference is acceptable for the system, the STATCOM's reactive output should be based on how much capacity it has available.

A STATCOM may also have additional modes besides voltage regulation or VAR control, depending on specific needs of the system. Examples being active filtering of system harmonics or gain control to accommodate system strength changes due to outages of generation or loads.

== Application ==
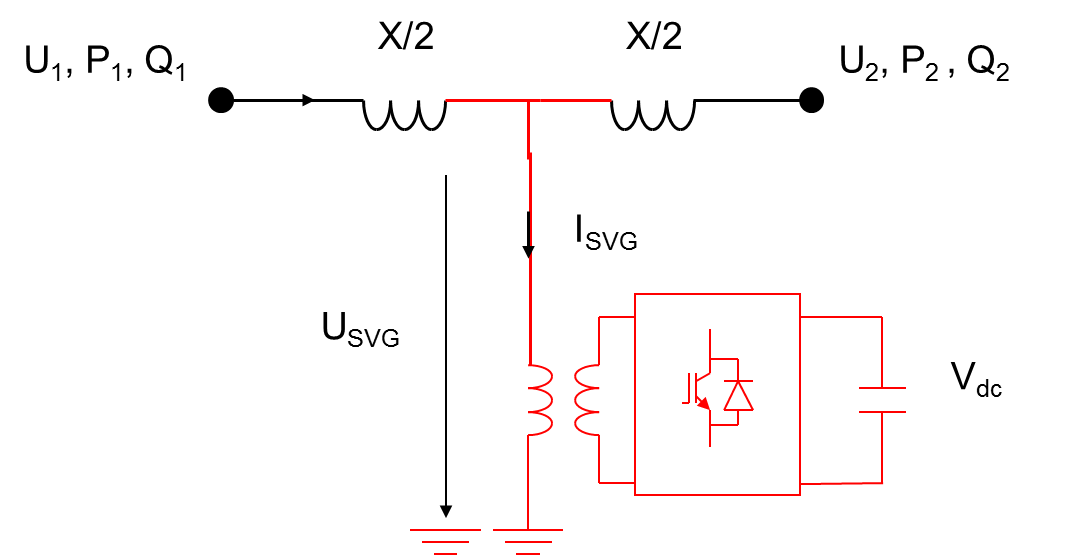
STATCOM application as a mid-point compensation device

As a fast, dynamic, and multi-quadrant source of reactive power, a STATCOM can be used for a wide variety of applications, however they are better suited for supporting the grid under fault or transient events or contingency events. One popular use is to place a STATCOM along a transmission line, to improve system power flow. Under normal operation the STATCOM will do very little, however in the event of a fault of a nearby line, the power that was being served is forced onto other transmission lines. Ordinarily this results in voltage drop increases due to increased power flow, but with a STATCOM available it can supply reactive power to increase the voltage until either the fault is removed (if temporary) or until a fixed capacitor can be switched in (if the fault is permanent). In some cases, a STATCOM can be installed at a substation, to help support multiple lines rather than just one, and help reducing the complexity of the protection on the line with a STATCOM on it.

Depending on available control function, STATCOMs can also be used for more advanced applications, such as active filtering, Power Oscillation Damping (POD), or even limited active power interactions. With growth of Distributed Energy Resources (DER) and Energy Storage, there has been research into using STATCOMs to aid or augment these uses. One area of recent research is virtual inertia: the use of an energy source on the DC side of a STATCOM to give it an inertia response similar to a synchronous condenser or generator.

== STATCOM vs. SVC ==
Fundamentally, a STATCOM is type of static VAR compensator (SVC), with the main difference being that a STATCOM is a voltage-sourced converter while a traditional SVC is a current-sourced converter. Historically, STATCOM have been costlier than an SVC, in part due to higher cost of IGBTs, but in recent years IGBT power ratings have increased, closing the gap.

The response time of a STATCOM is shorter than that of a SVC, mainly due to the fast-switching times provided by the IGBTs of the voltage source converter (thyristors cannot be switched off and must be commutated). As a result, the reaction time of a STATCOM is one to two cycles vs. two to three cycles for an SVC.

The STATCOM also provides better reactive power support at low AC voltages than an SVC, since the reactive power from a STATCOM decreases linearly with the AC voltage (the current can be maintained at the rated value even down to low AC voltage), as opposed to power being a function of a square of voltage for SVC. The SVC is not used in a severe undervoltage conditions (less than 0.6 pu), since leaving the capacitors on can worsen the transient overvoltage once the fault is cleared, while STATCOM can operate until 0.2–0.3 pu (this limit is due to possible loss of synchronicity and cooling).

The footprint of a STATCOM is smaller, as it does not need large capacitors used by an SVC for TSC or filters.

== See also ==
- Flexible AC Transmission Systems (FACTs)
- Static VAR Compensator (SVC)
- Synchronous Condenser
- High-Voltage DC (HVDC)
- Static synchronous series compensator (SSSC)
- Unified power flow controller (UPFC)
- Sieyuan Electric
