= Accumulator (energy) =

Energy storage device

An accumulator is an energy storage device: a device which accepts energy, stores energy, and releases energy as needed. Some accumulators accept energy at a low rate (low power) over a long time interval and deliver the energy at a high rate (high power) over a short time interval. Some accumulators accept energy at a high rate over a short time interval and deliver the energy at a low rate over a longer time interval. Some accumulators typically accept and release energy at comparable rates. Various devices can store thermal energy, mechanical energy, and electrical energy. Energy is usually accepted and delivered in the same form. Some devices store a different form of energy than what they receive and deliver performing energy conversion on the way in and on the way out.

Examples of accumulators include steam accumulators, mainsprings, flywheel energy storage, hydraulic accumulators, rechargeable batteries, capacitors, inductors, compensated pulsed alternators (compulsators), and pumped-storage hydroelectric plants.

In general usage in an electrical context, the word accumulator normally refers to a lead–acid battery.

The London Tower Bridge is operated via an accumulator. The original raising mechanism was powered by pressurised water stored in several hydraulic accumulators. In 1974, the original operating mechanism was largely replaced by a new electro-hydraulic drive system.

== See also ==
- Rechargeable battery
- Electric vehicle battery
- Battery storage power station

== Bibliography ==
- Wanger, E C; Willard, W E (June 1981). "Low Maintenance Hydraulic Accumulator" (report). Defense Technical Information Center. Boeing Military Airplane Company / USAF Wright Aeronautical Laboratories. Archived (PDF) from the original on September 24, 2015.
- Frazier, Captain John C. (December 1981). "Electric Vehicle Power Controller" (thesis). Defense Technical Information Center. Air Force Institute of Technology. Archived (PDF) from the original on September 24, 2015.
- Hayano, Ryugo S. (29 September 2009). "Development of a charged-particle accumulator using an RF confinement method" (report). Defense Technical Information Center. University of Tokyo. Archived (PDF) from the original on September 24, 2015.
- Tyler, Nathan (June 2008). "Design, Analysis and Construction of a High Voltage Capacitor Charging Supply" (thesis). Defense Technical Information Center. Naval Postgraduate School. Archived (PDF) from the original on September 24, 2015.
- Benediktov, G L (1 December 1983). "Thyristor Converter for Capacitive Laser Accumulators". Defense Technical Information Center. Foreign Technology Division, Wright-Patterson Air Force Base. Archived from the original (citation) on September 24, 2015.
- Babykin, M V; Bartov, A V (14 December 1977). "Methods of Obtaining Maximum Electrical Power in Short Pulses". Defense Technical Information Center. Foreign Technology Division, Wright-Patterson Air Force Base. Archived from the original (citation) on September 24, 2015.
