= Flywheel storage power system =

Energy storage system using flywheels

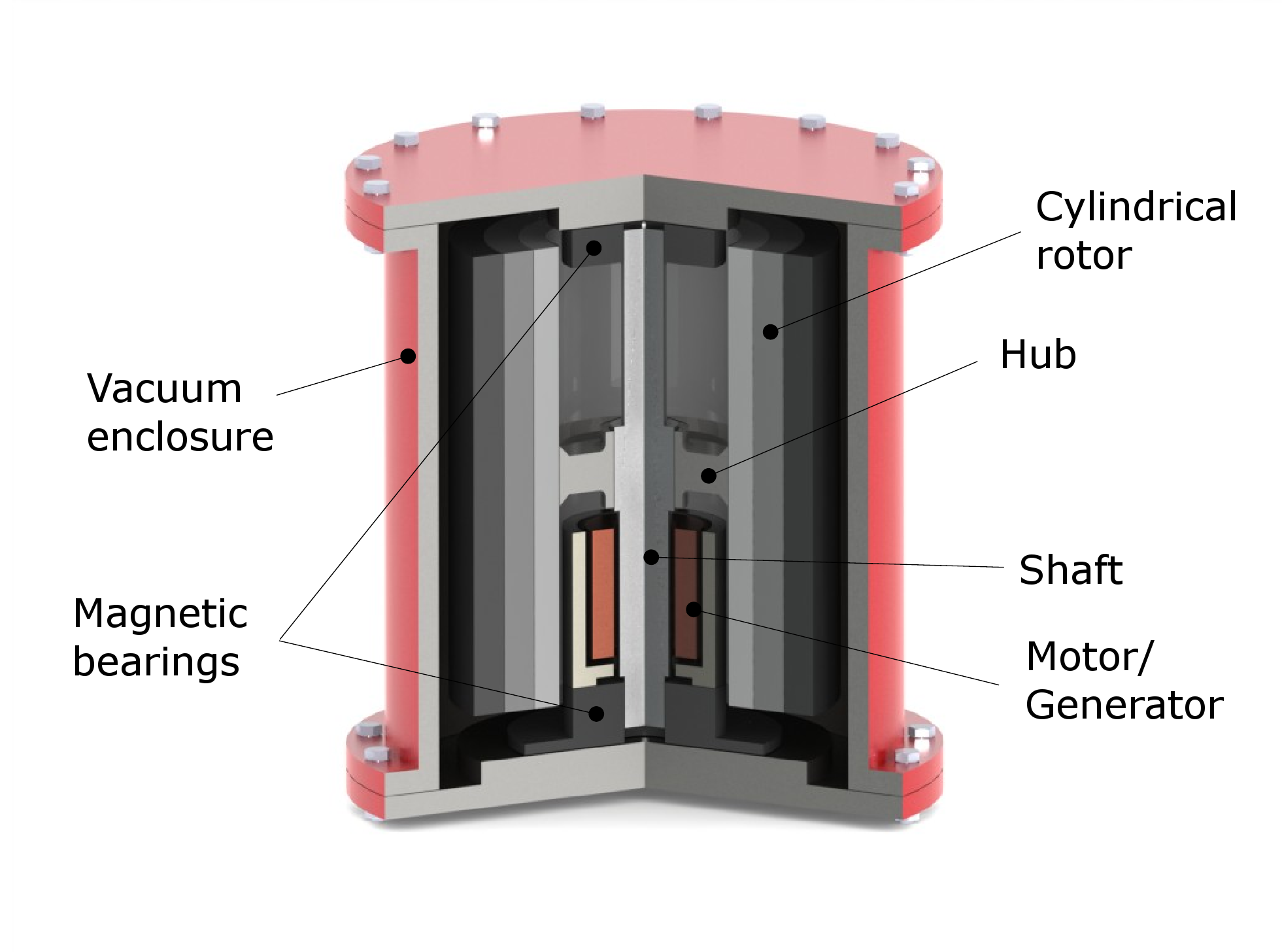
Sectional view of a flywheel storage with magnetic bearings and evacuated housing

A flywheel-storage power system uses a flywheel for grid energy storage, (see Flywheel energy storage) and can be a comparatively small storage facility with a peak power of up to 20 MW. It typically is used to stabilize to some degree power grids, to help them stay on the grid frequency, and to serve as a short-term compensation storage. Unlike common storage power plants, such as the pumped storage power plants with capacities up to 1000 MWh, the benefits from flywheel storage power plants can be obtained with a facility in the range of a few kWh to several tens of MWh. They are comparable in this application with battery storage power plants.

Possible areas of application are places where electrical energy can be obtained and stored, and must be supplied again to compensate for example, fluctuations in the seconds range in wind or solar power. These storage facilities consist of individual flywheels in a modular design. Energy up to 150 kWh can be absorbed or released per flywheel. Through combinations of several such flywheel accumulators, which are individually housed in buried underground vacuum tanks, a total power of up to several tens of MWh can be achieved. The electrical connections power low voltage motors via a DC intermediate circuit and the power converter systems are comparable to those found in plants used in the high-voltage direct current transmissions application.

Sometimes battery storage power stations are built with flywheel storage power systems in order to conserve battery power. Flywheels can handle rapid fluctuations better.

== Applications ==
=== Power grid frequency control ===
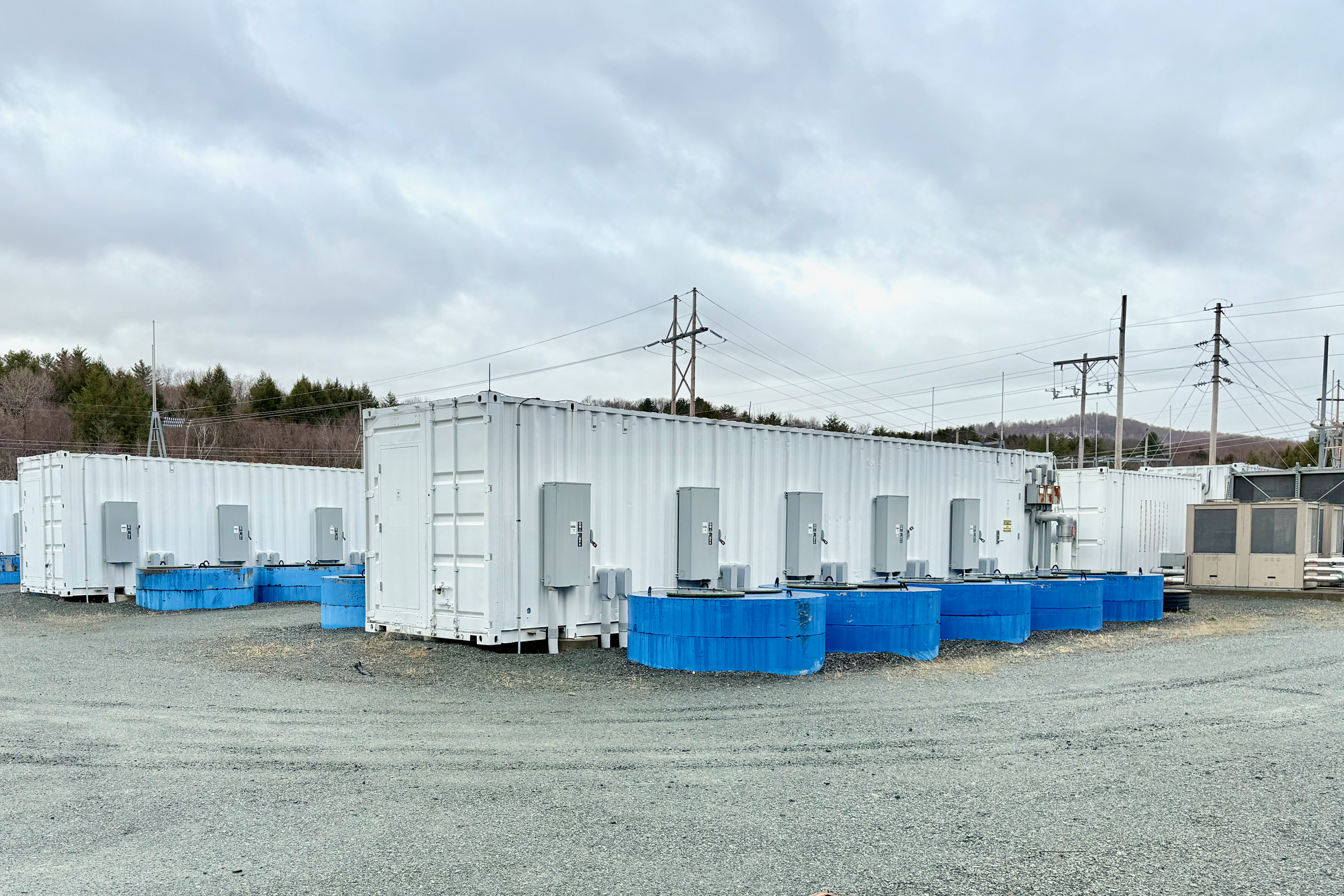
Beacon Power 20 MW flywheel energy storage plant in New York

In Stephentown, New York, Beacon Power operates in a flywheel storage power plant with 200 flywheels of 25 kWh capacity and 100 kW of power. Ganged together this gives 5 MWh capacity and 20 MW of power. The units operate at a peak speed at 15,000 rpm. The rotor flywheel consists of wound CFRP fibers which are filled with resin. The installation is intended primarily for frequency control. This service is sold to the New York power grid.

Stadtwerke München (SWM, Munich, Germany) uses a flywheel storage power system to stabilize the power grid, as well as control energy and to compensate for deviations from renewable energy sources. The plant originates from the Jülich Stornetic GmbH. The system consists of 28 flywheels and has a capacity of 100 kWh and a capacity of 600 kilovolt-amperes (kVA). The flywheels rotate at a peak speed of 45,000 rpm.

In Ontario, Canada, Temporal Power Ltd. has operated a flywheel storage power plant since 2014. It consists of 10 flywheels made of steel. Each flywheel weighs four tons and is 2.5 meters high. The maximum rotational speed is 11,500 rpm. The maximum power is 2 MW. The system is used for frequency regulation. After a successful three-year trial period, the system is to be expanded to 20 MW and then 100 MW.

=== Renewable energy ===
One challenge of variable renewable energy such as solar and wind power is a mismatch between supply and demand. For example, a period of high electricity generation from wind energy can be during a low electricity demand period. There are also demand from consumers during night times where there is no solar power generation. To address this, a solution is to deploy energy storage systems to provide "time shifting" capability. This is done by storing excess energy production during low-demand periods so that it can be used during high-demand periods. The city of Fresno in California is running flywheel storage power plants built by Amber Kinetics to store solar energy, which is produced in excess quantity in the daytime, for consumption at night.

Intermittent nature of variable renewable energy is another challenge. By adding more renewable energy sources to the grid could destabilize the grid. Energy storage systems that can respond quickly to the grid operator instructions can be a solution to this problem. Traditional storage systems can take up to five minutes to respond. A grid-scale flywheel energy storage system is able to respond to grid operator control signal in seconds and able to absorb the power fluctuation for as long as 15 minutes.

=== Tram braking and acceleration – power smoothing ===
Flywheel storage has proven to be useful in trams. During braking (such as when arriving at a station), high energy peaks are found which can not be always fed back into the power grid due to the potential danger of overloading the system. The flywheel energy storage power plants are in containers on side of the tracks and take the excess electrical energy. For example, up to 200 MWh energy per brake system is annually recovered in Zwickau.

== Deployed systems ==
China has the largest grid-scale flywheel energy storage plant in the world with 30 MW capacity. The system was connected to the grid in 2024 and it was the first such system in China.

In the United States, Beacon Power operates two 20 MW grid-scale flywheel energy storage plants in Stephentown, New York and Hazle Township, Pennsylvania.

On the island of Aruba is currently a 5 MWh flywheel storage power plant built by Temporal Power Ltd. The island intends to convert its energy supply to 100 percent renewables by 2020.

== Energy loss ==
As of 2013, it is possible to build a flywheel storage system that loses just 5 percent of the energy stored in it per day (i.e. the self-discharge rate).

== See also ==
- Search for the Super Battery (2017 PBS film)
