= Reliant Tom =

American indie rock band

My So-Called Summer, formerly Reliant Tom
- Origin: Brooklyn, New York
- Years active: 2015–present
- Label: Diversion Records
- Members: Claire Cuny; Monte Weber
- Website: ReliantTom.com

My So-Called Summer, formerly Reliant Tom is an American indie pop band based in Stephentown, New York.

== Background ==
Reliant Tom originated as a band in 2015. The Brooklyn-based post-rock electronic band and experimental performance art group is centered around its core creative duo of composer Monte Weber along with choreographer and vocalist Claire Cuny.

The duo’s first two releases included a self-released, self-titled EP in 2016 and a full-length debut effort Bad Orange in 2018. Released in the Spring 2020, through Chicago-based Diversion Records, the group's sophomore effort is entitled Play & Rewind. The group self-released their 3rd and final album Dancer in the Dark as Reliant Tom in 2023 before changing their name from Reliant Tom to My So-Called Summer in 2025.

== Reception ==
Pop Dust's Randy Radic stated of their track "11-2", "Claire's haunting tones invest the lyrics with stark melancholy”.

Matt Matasci of MXDWN wrote, "Claire Cuny’s rich, sultry vocals take the forefront. Plinking piano keys and a gradually shift into heavier instrumentation add a dramatic flare to the song, showcasing the undeniable chemistry of Cuny and her bandmate Monte Weber” regarding their song "Never Mind The Garbage". About the same track, Black Book Magazine wrote, "Building from moody ballad, to Cobain-worthy midesection and ending in a sparse trance of harmonis, the track viscerally captures the rise and fall of emotions that come with death”.

== Discography ==
- Reliant Tom EP (2016)
- Bad Orange (2018)
- Play & Rewind (2020)
- When We Were Young (2021)
- Dancer in the Dark (2023)
