= Energy storage device =

Energy storage device may refer to:

- Electric double-layer capacitor, e.g., in automobiles
- Any energy storage device, e.g.
  - Flywheel energy storage
  - Rechargeable battery
