= Beacon Power =

Beacon Power, LLC
- Type: Subsidiary
- Traded as: OTC Pink No Information: BCONQ
- Industry: Flywheel energy storage, utility frequency
- Predecessor: Beacon Power Inc.
- Founded: 1997; 29 years ago
- Headquarters: Tyngsboro, Massachusetts, U.S.
- Area served: New York, United States
- Revenue: US$900 thousand (2010)
- Operating income: US$-21,340 thousand (2010)
- Net income: US$-22,680 thousand (2010)
- Total assets: US$11,940 thousand (2010)
- Total equity: US$28,630 thousand (2010)
- Parent: RGA Investments, LLC
- Website: beaconpower.com

Beacon Power, LLC is an American limited liability company and wholly owned subsidiary of RGA Investments LLC. Founded in 1997 and headquartered in Tyngsboro, Massachusetts, it specializes in flywheel-based energy storage. Beacon designs and develops products aimed at utility frequency regulation for power grid operations.

The storage systems are designed to help utilities match supply with varying demand by storing excess power in arrays of 2,800-pound (1,300 kg) flywheels at off-peak times for use during peak demand.

== History ==
Beacon Power was founded in Woburn, Massachusetts in 1997 as a subsidiary of SatCon Technology Corporation, a maker of alternative energy management systems. The company went public in 2000. In June 2008, Beacon Power opened new headquarters in Tyngsboro, with financing from Massachusetts state agencies.

In 2009 Beacon received a loan guarantee from the United States Department of Energy (DOE) for $43 million to build a 20-megawatt flywheel power plant in Stephentown, New York. The DOE loan for $43 million was awarded in 2010, with the plant to be online by 2011. It also was awarded $24 million from the DOE for a second flywheel plant.

On 30 October 2011, the company filed for Chapter 11 bankruptcy protection under in the United States bankruptcy court in Delaware. As part of the bankruptcy court proceedings, Beacon Power agreed on November 18 to sell its Stephentown facility to repay the DOE loan.

As of 6 February 2012, Rockland Capital, a private equity firm, bought the plant and most of the company's other assets for $30.5 million. Rockland Capital stated it intended to rehire most of staff and to provide the capital to build a second 20MW plant in Pennsylvania.

On May 1, 2018, the investment arm of RGA Labs acquired the company. The physical assets, the 20 MW NY Facility named Stephentown Spindle and the 20 MW facility in Hazle Township, Pennsylvania were sold to Convergent Energy and Power in 2018.

== See also ==
- Distributed generation
- Flywheel energy storage
- List of energy storage projects
