= David Holloway =

David Holloway may refer to:

- David Holloway (American football) (born 1983), linebacker in the National Football League
- David Holloway (baritone), American opera singer, in Le comte Ory etc.
- David P. Holloway (1809–1883), U.S. Representative from Indiana
- David R. Holloway (1924–1995), literary editor at the Daily Telegraph, see List of winners and shortlisted authors of the Booker Prize for Fiction
