= Battery energy storage system =

Energy storage system using electrochemical secondary cells

A battery energy storage system (BESS), battery storage power station, battery energy grid storage (BEGS) or battery grid storage is a type of energy storage technology that uses a group of batteries in the grid to store electrical energy. Battery storage is the fastest responding dispatchable source of power on electric grids, and it is used to stabilise those grids, as battery storage can transition from standby to full power in under a second to deal with grid contingencies.

Battery energy storage systems are generally designed to deliver their full rated power for durations ranging from 1 to 4 hours, with emerging technologies extending this to longer durations to meet evolving grid demands. Battery storage can be used for short-term peak power demand and for ancillary services, such as providing operating reserve and frequency control to minimize the chance of power outages.

They are often installed at, or close to, other active or disused power stations and may share the same grid connection to reduce costs. Since battery storage plants require no deliveries of fuel, are compact compared to generating stations and have no chimneys or large cooling systems, they can be rapidly installed and placed if necessary within urban areas, close to customer load, or even inside customer premises.

In 2025, the worldwide nonprofit Volta Foundation reported global BESS deployments grew by 104 GW / 257 GWh as costs fell 31% year on year. 40% of the cumulative BESS capacity was installed in 2025 alone.

In 2021, the power and capacity of the largest individual battery storage system was an order of magnitude less than that of the largest pumped-storage power plants, the most common form of grid energy storage. However, grid batteries do not have to be large — a high number of smaller ones (often as hybrid power) can be widely deployed across a grid for greater redundancy and large overall capacity.

As of 2019, battery power storage is typically cheaper than open cycle gas turbine power for use up to two hours, and there was around 365 GWh of battery storage deployed worldwide, growing rapidly. Levelized cost of storage (LCOS) has fallen rapidly. From 2014 to 2024, cost halving time was 4.1 years. The price was US$150 per MWh in 2020, and further reduced to US$117 by 2023.

== Construction ==
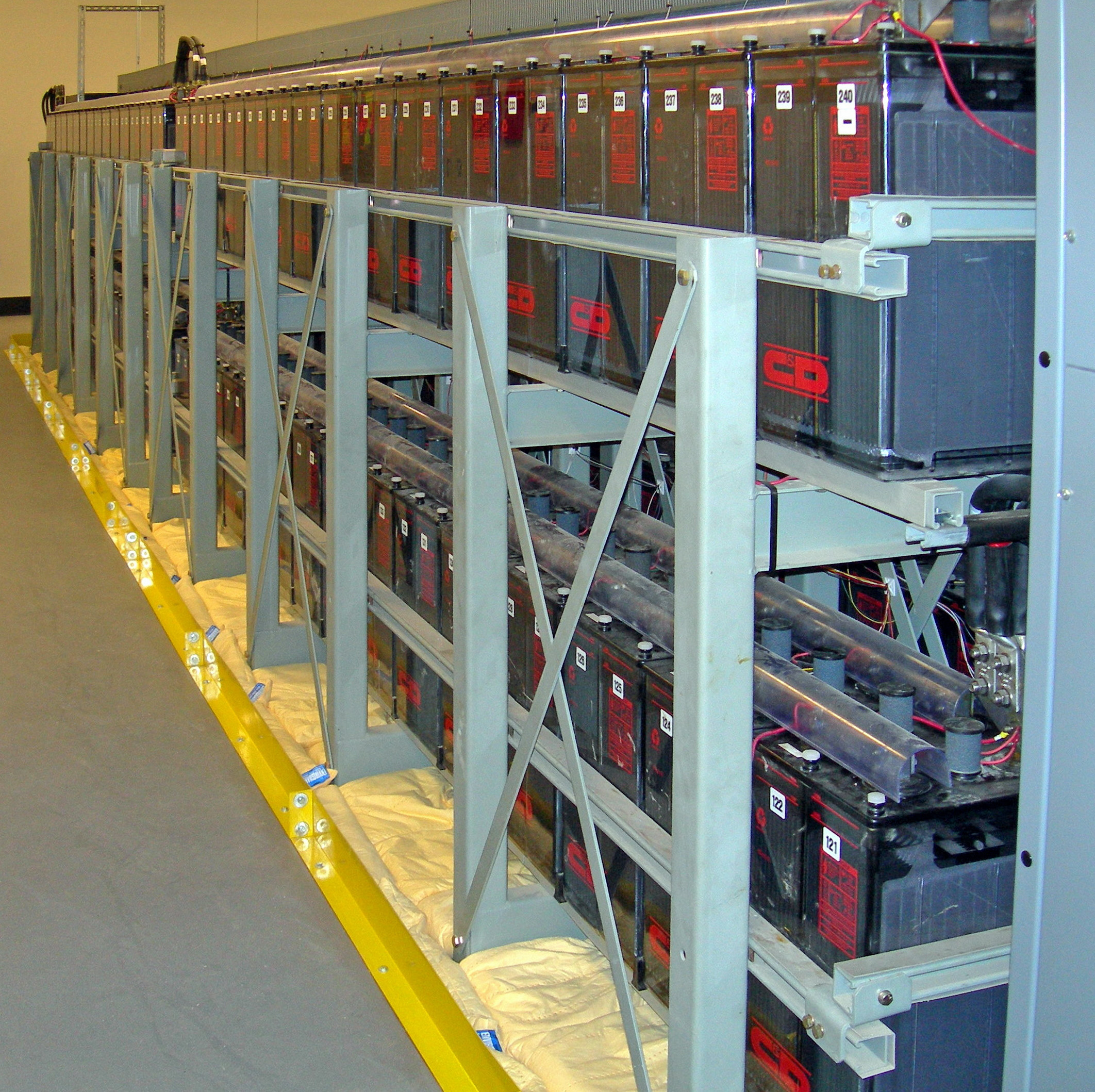
A rechargeable battery bank used in a data center

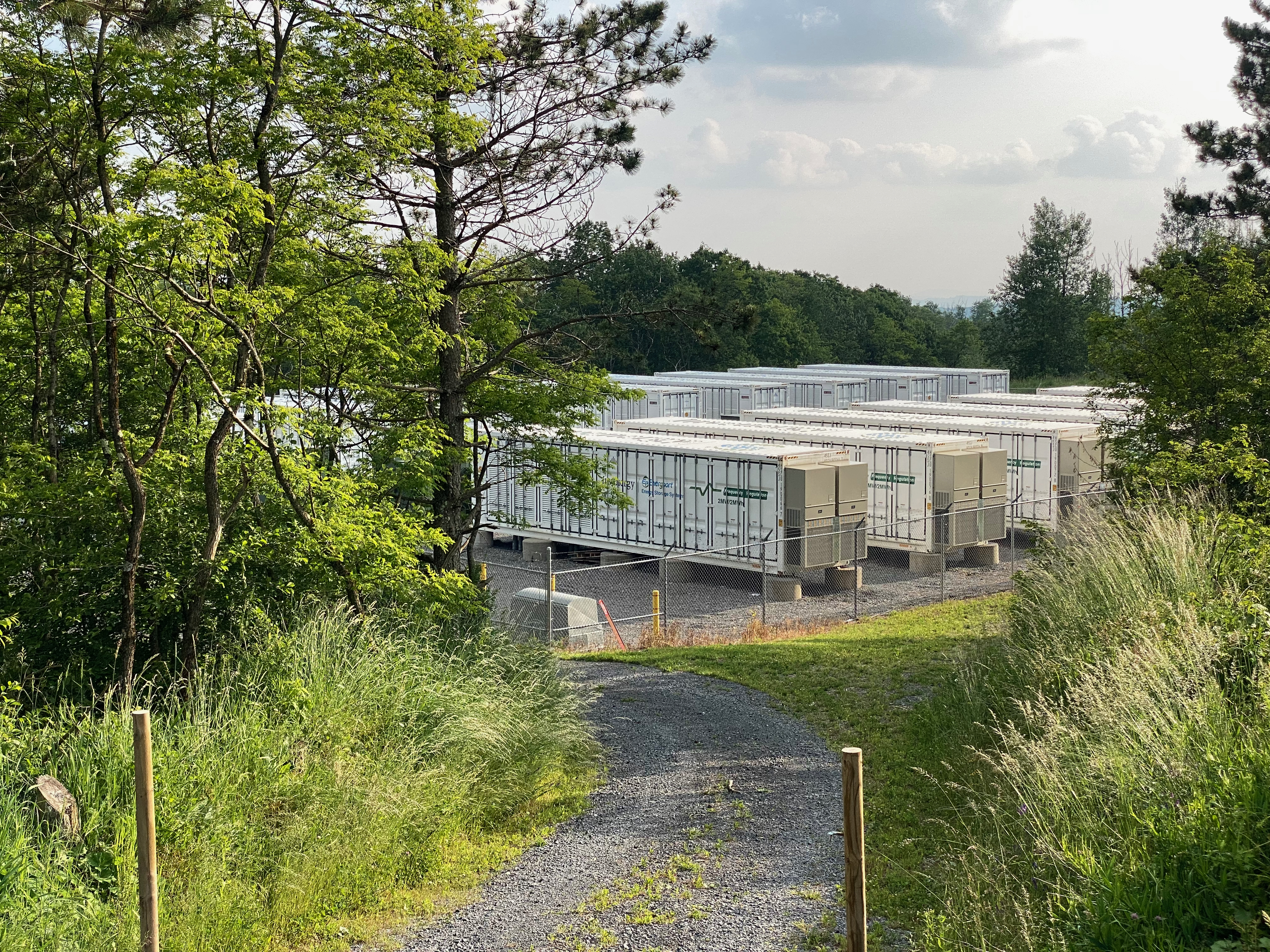
Lithium iron phosphate battery modules packaged in shipping containers installed at Beech Ridge Energy Storage System in West Virginia

Battery storage power plants and uninterruptible power supplies (UPS) are comparable in technology and function. However, battery storage power plants are larger.

For safety and security, the actual batteries are housed in their own structures, like warehouses or containers. As with a UPS, one concern is that electrochemical energy is stored or emitted in the form of direct current (DC), while electric power networks are usually operated with alternating current (AC). For this reason, additional inverters are needed to connect the battery storage power plants to the high voltage network. This kind of power electronics includes gate turn-off thyristor, commonly used in high-voltage direct current (HVDC) transmission.

Various accumulator systems may be used depending on the power-to-energy ratio, the expected lifetime and the costs. In the 1980s, lead-acid batteries were used for the first battery-storage power plants. During the next few decades, nickel–cadmium, nickel-hydride and sodium–sulfur batteries were increasingly used. Since 2010, utility-scale battery storage plants have increasingly relied on lithium-ion batteries, following declines in their cost and increases in their energy and power capabilities associated with the growth of the electric-vehicle industry. Batteries are becoming increasingly diverse, optimized for different aspects of customer requirements such as cost, safety, or durability.

A 4-hour flow vanadium redox battery at 175 MW / 700 MWh opened in 2024. Lead-acid batteries are still used in small budget applications.

== Safety ==
Most of the BESS systems are composed of securely sealed battery packs, which are electronically monitored and replaced once their performance falls below a given threshold. Batteries suffer from cycle ageing, or deterioration caused by charge–discharge cycles. This deterioration is generally higher at high charging rates and higher depth of discharge. This aging causes a loss of performance (capacity or voltage decrease), overheating, and may eventually lead to critical failure (electrolyte leaks, fire, explosion). Sometimes battery storage power stations are built with flywheel storage power systems in order to conserve battery power. Flywheels may handle rapid fluctuations better than older battery plants.

BESS warranties typically include lifetime limits on energy throughput, expressed as number of charge–discharge cycles.

In the United States, concerns about fires at large battery-storage facilities have led some communities to oppose proposed projects and adopt temporary moratoria. In 2025, the Associated Press reported that at least several dozen localities had moved to temporarily block development of large battery systems.

=== Lead-acid based batteries ===
Lead-acid batteries, as a first-generation technology, are generally used in older BESS systems. One example is a battery commissioned in 1997 with a peak output of 1.6 MW and a continuous output of 1.0 MW. Compared to modern rechargeable batteries, lead-acid batteries have relatively low energy density. Despite this, they are able to supply high surge currents. However, non-sealed lead-acid batteries produce hydrogen and oxygen from the aqueous electrolyte when overcharged. The water must be replenished regularly to avoid damage to the battery, while the flammable gases must be vented to reduce the risk of explosion. This maintenance is not required for sealed technologies such as Li-ion batteries.

=== Lithium-based batteries ===
The installed capacity of lithium-ion grid battery storage in the US has grown steadily since the 2010s.

Lithium-ion batteries offer a long lifespan with minimal maintenance, high energy density, and low self-discharge, which makes them ideal for modern utility-scale BESS applications.

A drawback of some types of lithium-ion batteries is fire safety, mostly ones containing cobalt. The number of BESS incidents has remained around 10–20 per year (mostly within the first 2–3 years of age), despite the large increase in number and size of BESS. Thus failure rate has decreased. Failures occurred mostly in controls and balance of system, while 11% occurred in cells. By 2025, failure rate decreased to 0.04 failures per GWh deployed.

Examples of BESS fire accidents include individual modules in 23 battery farms in South Korea in 2017 to 2019, a Tesla Megapack in Geelong, the fire and subsequent explosion of a battery module in Arizona, and the cooling liquid short circuiting incidents and fire at the Moss Landing LG battery.

This resulted in more research in recent years for mitigation measures for fire safety.

By 2024, the lithium iron phosphate (LFP) battery has become another significant type for large storages due to the high availability of its components, longer lifetime and higher safety compared to nickel-based Li-ion chemistries. An LFP-based energy storage system that was installed in Paiyun Lodge on Mt. Jade (Yushan) (the highest alpine lodge in Taiwan) and operated since 2016 without a safety incident.

=== Sodium-based batteries ===
Sodium-based batteries are another BESS technology. Compared to lithium-ion batteries, sodium-ion batteries have somewhat lower cost, better safety characteristics, and similar power delivery characteristics, but lower energy density. Its working principle and cell construction are similar, but use sodium instead of lithium as the intercalating ion. Sodium–sulfur batteries can operate safely at high temperatures. Notable sodium battery producers with high safety claims include (non-exclusive) Altris AB, SgNaPlus and Tiamat. The largest BESS utilizing sodium-ion technology began operating in Hubei province in 2024, with a capacity of 50 MW / 100 MWh. In 2026, CATL unveiled its modular TENER Sodium Energy Storage System, which offers 30 MWh storage capacity. It can deliver power for storage durations of 1, 2, 4, 6, and 8 hours, depending on the application. It operates at 65 decibels. It contracted with HyperStrong for a 60 gwh system.

== Operating characteristics ==
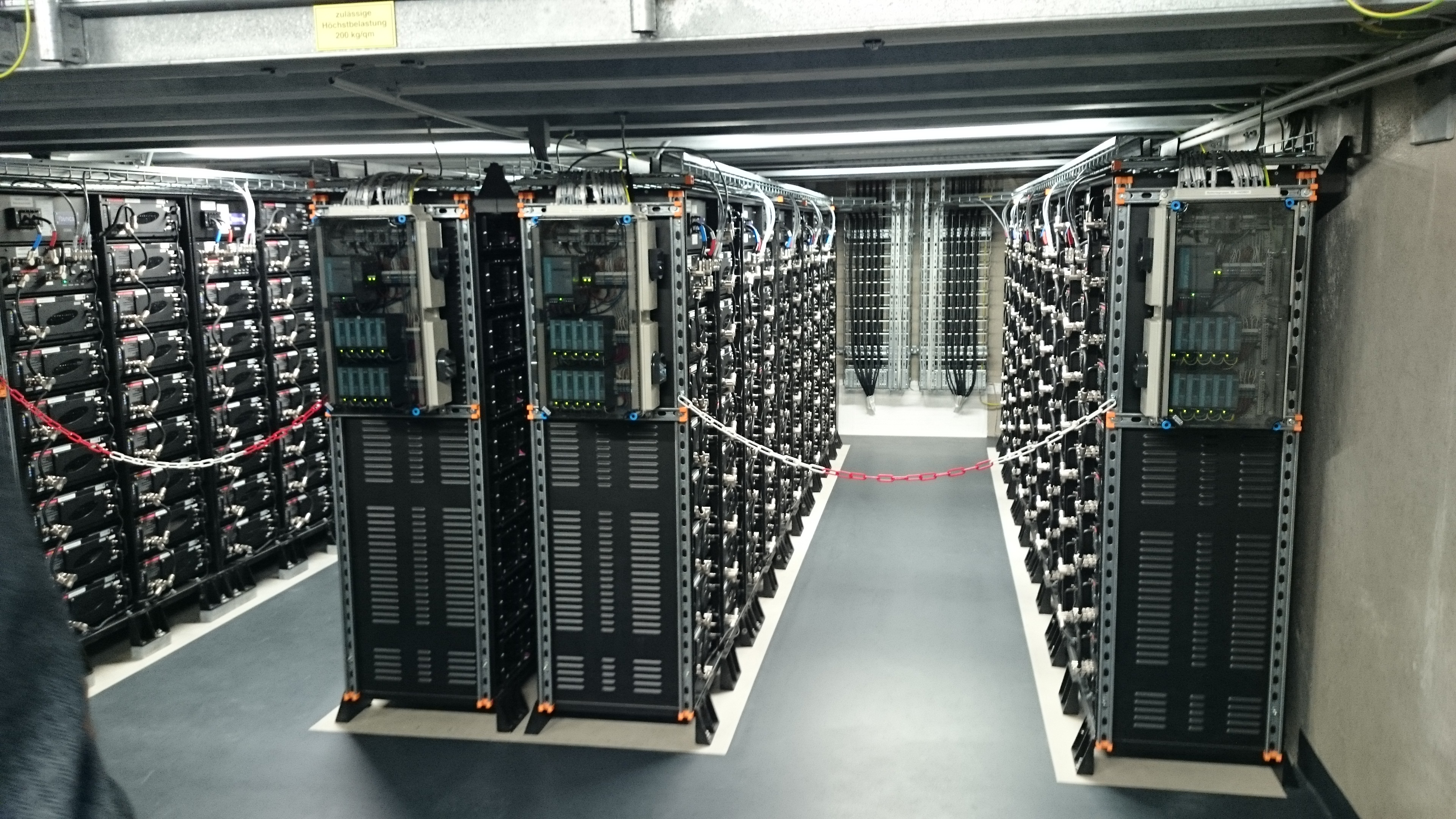
Battery storage power plant at Schwerin (interior view 2014, modular rows of accumulators)

Since they do not have any mechanical parts, battery storage power plants offer extremely short control times and start times, as little as 10 ms. They can therefore help dampen the fast oscillations that occur when electrical power networks are operated close to their maximum capacity or when grids suffer anomalies. These instabilities – fluctuations with periods of as much as 30 seconds – can produce peak swings of such amplitude that they can cause regional blackouts. Some of the parameters are voltage, frequency and phase. A properly sized battery storage power plant can efficiently counteract these oscillations; therefore, applications are found primarily in those regions where electrical power systems are operated at full capacity, leading to a risk of instability. However, some batteries have insufficient control systems, failing during moderate disruptions they should have tolerated. Batteries are also commonly used for peak shaving for periods of up to a few hours. A more recent use is strengthening transmission, as long power lines can be operated closer to their capacity when batteries handle the local difference between supply and demand.

Storage plants can also be used in combination with an intermittent renewable energy source in stand-alone power systems.

== Largest grid batteries ==
=== Operating ===
10 largest battery storage power plants by storage capacity
Name	Commissioning date	Energy (MWh)	Power (MW)	Duration (hours)	Type	Country	Location/coords	Refs
Chagan Hada	2026	4000				Inner Mongolia, China		
Elena (Oasis de Atacama)	2026	3500	446	7	LFP	Chile	María Elena 22.21°S 69.52°W	
Edwards Sanborn	2022-2024	3287			Lithium-ion	United States		
Khavda	2026	2880				India	Gujarat	
Najran, Khamis Mushait, and Madaya	2025	2600 each (7.8 GWh combined)	680	3.8	LFP	Saudi Arabia		grid-forming & black start 380kV grid
Collie Synergy	2025	2400	500	4.8	LFP	Australia	Collie, Western Australia	
Collie Neoen	2025	2240	560	4	LFP	Australia	33.312°S 116.292°E	
Bisha	2025	2000	500	4	Lithium-ion	Saudi Arabia	Asir	
Kashgar	July 2025	2000	500	4	LFP	China	Xinjiang	250 MW grid-forming inverters
Tongliao	December 2025	2000	500	4	LFP	China		
Vistra Moss Landing	2021 Q2 – 2023 Q3	1800 (was 3000)	450 (was 750)	4	Lithium-ion	United States	Moss Landing, California	
Eraring 1	2025	1770 (2800 in phase 2)	460 (700 in phase 2)	4		Australia	33°03′44″S 151°31′13″E	
Melton/Melbourne Renewable Energy Hub	December 2025	1600	600	2.5	Lithium-ion	Australia	Melton, Victoria	
Gemini	March 2024	1416	380	4	Lithium-ion	United States	Clark County, Nevada	
Dengkou	January 2025	1410	605	2.3	LFP + vanadium flow	China	Bayannur	
Crimson	October 2022	1400	350	4	Lithium-ion	United States	Riverside County, California	
Desert Peak Energy Storage I	July 2023	1300	325	4	Lithium-ion	United States	Palm Springs, California	
The Red Sea Project	2024	1300			Lithium-ion	Saudi Arabia	Tabuk province	Off-the-grid/microgrid
Víctor Jara (Oasis de Atacama)	May 2026	1300	200	6.5	LFP	Chile	Tarapacá Region	
Eleven Mile	2024	1200	300	4		United States	Pinal County	
Papago	2025	1200	300	4	LFP	United States	Phoenix, Arizona	

=== Under construction ===
10 largest battery power plants under construction
Name	Planned commissioning date	Energy (MWh)	Power (MW)	Duration (hours)	Type	Country	Location	Refs
Masdar / Emirates Water and Electricity Company (EWEC)	2027	19000	1000	19		UAE		
Chayouzhong		6000	1000	6		China		
Meralco Terra Phase 1	2026	3300				Philippines	Nueva Ecija & Bulacan	2500 MW solar
Baotou Boerhantu	2026	3000	1000	6		China		
Baotou Weijun	2026	3000	500	6		China		
Green Turtle	2028	2800	700	4		Belgium	Dilsen-Stokkem	
Ordos Gushanliang	2026	2000	500	4		China		
Waratah Origin	~~2025~~ 2026	1680	350 (850 final)		Lithium-ion	Australia		
South Pine Supernode	2026	2540 (500 in stage 1)	750 (250 in stage 1)	2.5		Australia	27.319°S 152.968°E	

=== Planned ===
10 largest battery power plants planned
Name	Planned commissioning date	Energy (MWh)	Power (MW)	Duration (hours)	Type	Country	Location	Refs
Ravenswood	2024	2528	316	8	Lithium-ion	United States		
Northern Gilboa		3200	800	4		Israel		
Libra	2027	2800	700	4	Lithium-ion	United States	Yerington, Nevada	
FlexBase	2028	1600	800	2	Redox-Flow	Switzerland	Laufenburg, Aargau	
Energy Australia Jeeralang big battery	2026	1400	350	4	Lithium-ion	Australia		
Mufasa	2026	1450	360	4		Netherlands	Vlissingen	

== Market development and deployment ==
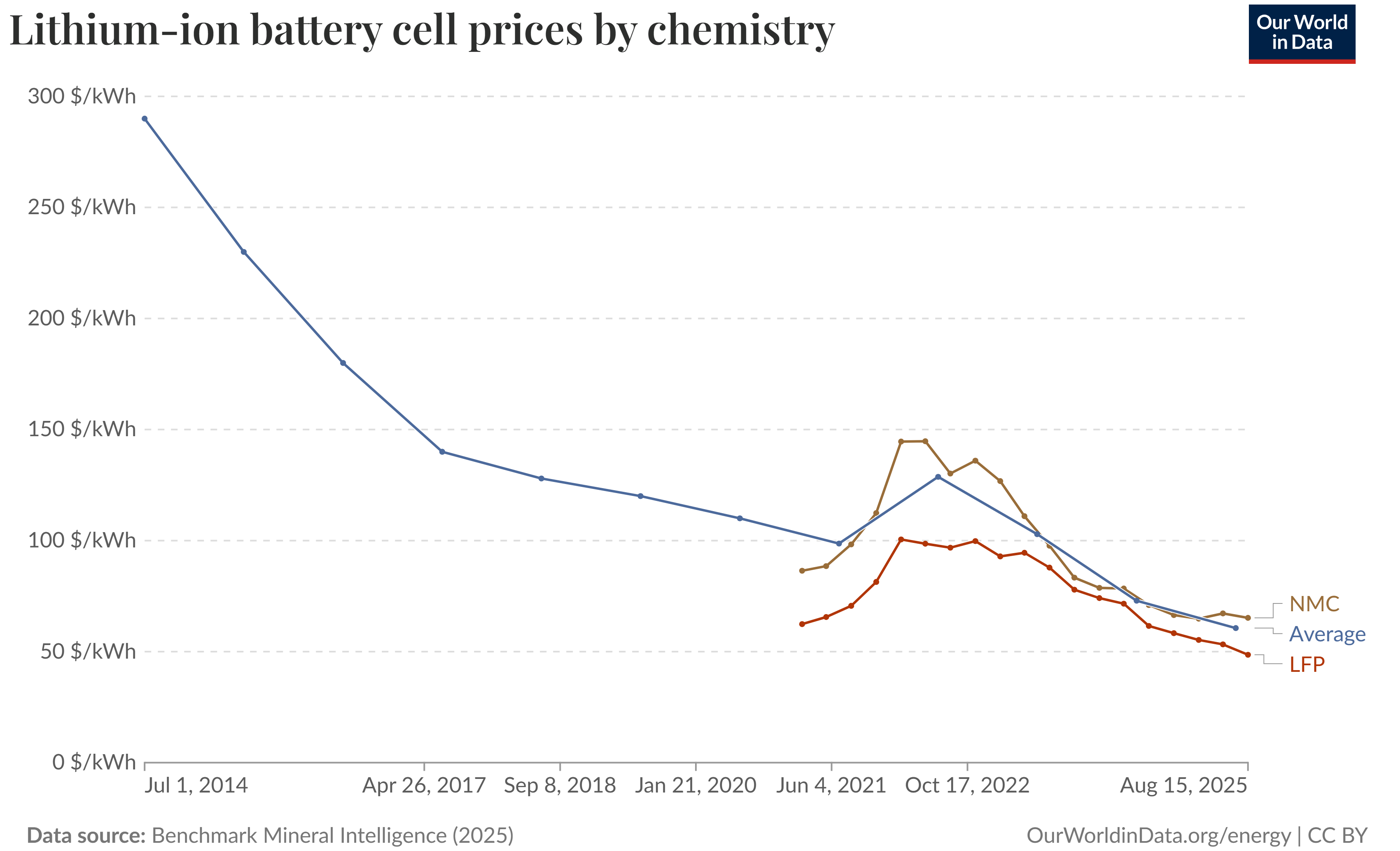
Lithium-ion battery cell prices by chemistry, 2014-2025

Since 1991, the cost of lithium-ion batteries has declined by 99%. On average, the price declined about 19% for each doubling of installed capacity.

2024 cost components of grid battery in Europe, % of 400 €/kWh system cost
1. Cells (35.0%)
2. Power conversion (15.0%)
3. Balance of plant (15.0%)
4. Infrastructure (20.0%)
5. Installation (15.0%)

By 2025, global grid battery power capacity was 267 GW with 610 GWh energy capacity, compared to the other major form of grid storage, pumped-storage hydroelectricity with 200 GW power and 9000 GWh energy storage worldwide as of 2025 according to International Hydropower Association. The battery market had thus surpassed the power generation capacity of pumped-storage, but remained far smaller in terms of energy capacity.

Relative to 2010, batteries and photovoltaics have followed roughly the same downward price curve due to experience curve effects. Cells are the major cost component, costing 30-40% of a full system. Batteries' rapid increase occurred as price drops, with over 100 GW added (mostly LFP) in 2025, up from 10 GW in 2021. In 2025, solar power added was down to 6 times bigger than battery power added, as battery increased much faster than solar. Average world system price was around $120/kWh in 2025.

The amount of batteries and their associated operational money flow became an investible asset class by 2026, pooling several separate batteries into centrally controlled portfolios. This allows small developers with low funds to partner with groups of institutional investors without practical knowledge of the electricity business, to the benefit of both. This is a contrast to the usual single energy company approach of developing, owning and operating an electricity facility.

By mid-2025, China passed 100 GW batteries (164 GW total storage) and added capacity market payments. As of May 2025, China’s cumulative BESS installations were reported at 106.9 GW and 240.3 GWh, with global battery storage deployment of nearly 9 GWh in April 2025. At the end of 2024, China had 62 GW / 141 GWh of battery power stations. In 2020, China added 1,557 MW to its battery storage capacity, while storage facilities for photovoltaics projects accounting for 27% of the capacity, to the total 3,269 MW of electrochemical energy storage capacity.

The United States installed 57.6 GWh in 2025, and 12.3 GW / 37.1 GWh of batteries in 2024. USA had 70 GWh production capacity in 2025, roughly corresponding to domestic market size. In 2022, US capacity doubled to 9 GW / 25 GWh. At the end of 2021, the capacity grew to 4,588 MW. The 2021 price of a 60 MW / 240 MWh (4-hour) battery installation in the United States was US$379/usable kWh, or US$292/nameplate kWh, a 13% drop from 2020. In 2010, the United States had 59 MW of battery storage capacity from 7 battery power plants. This increased to 49 plants comprising 351 MW of capacity in 2015. In 2018, the capacity was 869 MW from 125 plants, capable of storing a maximum of 1,236 MWh of generated electricity. By the end of 2020, the battery storage capacity reached 1,756 MW. The US market for storage power plants in 2015 increased by 243% compared to 2014.

In June 2024 the capacity was 4.6 GW of power and 5.9 GWh of energy in the United Kingdom. In 2022, UK capacity grew by 800 MWh, ending at 2.4 GW / 2.6 GWh. As of May 2021, 1.3 GW of battery storage was operating, with 16 GW of projects in the pipeline potentially deployable over the next few years.

As of the end of 2024, Europe had reached 61 GWh of installed battery energy storage capacity, after adding 21 GWh that year. Germany and Italy each contributed approximately 6 GWh to this growth. The average installation cost during 2024 ranged between €300 and €400 per kilowatt-hour. By comparison, Europe deployed 1.9 GW of new battery capacity in 2022. Developments in Germany are closely monitored by RWTH Aachen University site battery-charts.de, reporting in September 2025 15 GW and 22 GWh mostly in over 2 million home-based systems, while 1.84 Mio. registered Battery Electric Vehicles (BEVs) in Germany have an estimated energy capacity of over 115 GWh.

Japan’s energy sector has also undergone significant growth in renewable energy capacity. expanding by over 30% within five years, which has contributed to a sharp increase in demand for battery energy storage systems (BESS). More than half of the 2.4 GW of BESS capacity awarded in recent long-term low-carbon power auctions was allocated to foreign-owned companies or consortia. Projects approved in 2024 alone comprise more than 1.37 GW of power capacity and over 6.7 GWh of energy capacity. The country’s Long-Term Decarbonization Power Source Auction supports BESS deployment by guaranteeing fixed cost recovery over a 20-year period. However, constraints such as limited price volatility and a price floor in Japan’s power market may limit investment returns for storage operators, signaling the need for further regulatory reform.

Worldwide in 2024, suppliers CRRC had 8% market share, Sungrow 14%, and Tesla Energy 15%.

Some developers are also utilizing retired electric vehicle batteries to build second-life storage systems, with costs potentially 50% lower than those of new battery installations. Nonetheless, due to the declining cost of new batteries, buyers of second-life systems may only be willing to pay around 10% of the original cost. In 2024, a 53 MWh battery storage facility built from approximately 900 used electric vehicle batteries was commissioned in Texas.

The major 2025 Iberian Peninsula blackout severed the Iberian grid from the rest of Europe on 28 April and then collapsed to a complete blackout in just five seconds, then caused some deaths plus economic losses estimated at up to €4.5 billion. The importance of system resilience has become increasingly prominent in Spain. Battery Energy Storage Systems were at a very low level at around 20 MW, but are now regarded as a key pillar of the Spanish energy transition. Major utilities such as Iberdrola and Solaria are now actively developing hybrid solar-plus-storage projects to mitigate the impact of solar overproduction and declining market prices. Solaria alone has launched eight new BESS installations in Castilla y León and Castilla-La Mancha. By April 2026, Spain had 193 MW of grid batteries, and 339 MWh of home batteries, with more in projects.

== See also ==
- List of energy storage power plants
