= Brian Holloway =

American football player (born 1959)

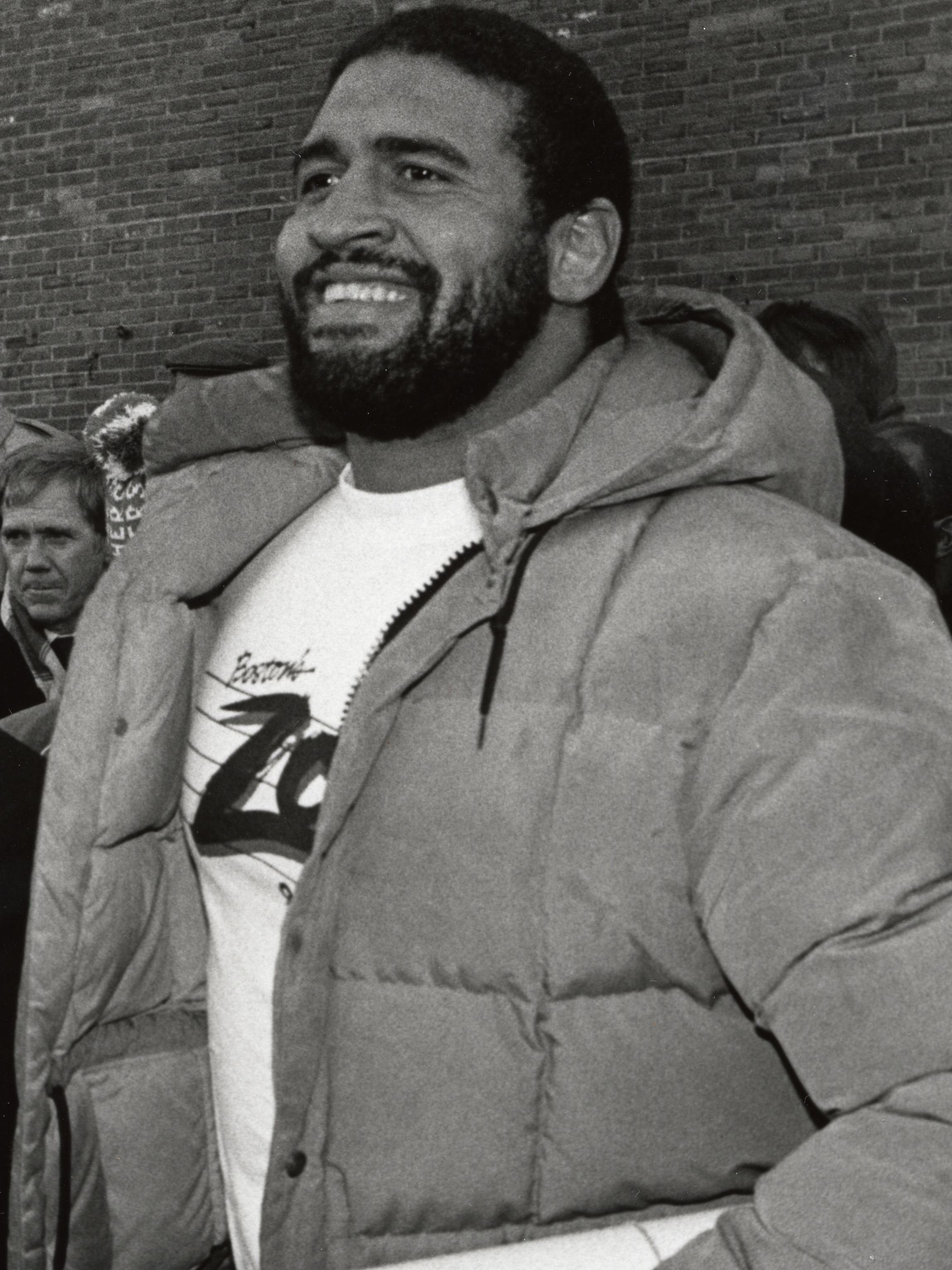
- Holloway in 1985

No. 76
- Position: Offensive lineman

Personal information
- Born: July 25, 1959 (age 67); Omaha, Nebraska, U.S.
- Listed height: 6 ft 7 in (2.01 m)
- Listed weight: 284 lb (129 kg)

Career information
- High school: Winston Churchill (Potomac, Maryland)
- College: Stanford
- NFL draft: 1981: 1st round, 19th overall pick

Career history
- New England Patriots (1981–1986); Los Angeles Raiders (1987–1988)

Awards and highlights
- Second-team All-Pro (1985); 3× Pro Bowl (1983–1985); New England Patriots All-1980s Team; First-team All-Pac-10 (1980); Second-team All-Pac-10 (1979)

Career NFL statistics
- Games played: 102
- Games started: 85
- Fumble recoveries: 4
- Stats at Pro Football Reference

Brian Douglass Holloway (born July 25, 1959) is an American former professional football player who was an offensive tackle who played in the National Football League (NFL) for the New England Patriots and Los Angeles Raiders from 1981 to 1988. He played college football for the Stanford Cardinal. He is the father of David Holloway, who also played professional football.

== Early life ==
Holloway was a standout athlete at Winston Churchill High School in Potomac, Maryland, playing on the 1976 state championship football team and breaking the school record in the shot put. He was recruited by Bill Walsh to Stanford University, where he earned All-American honors.

== Professional career ==
=== New England Patriots ===
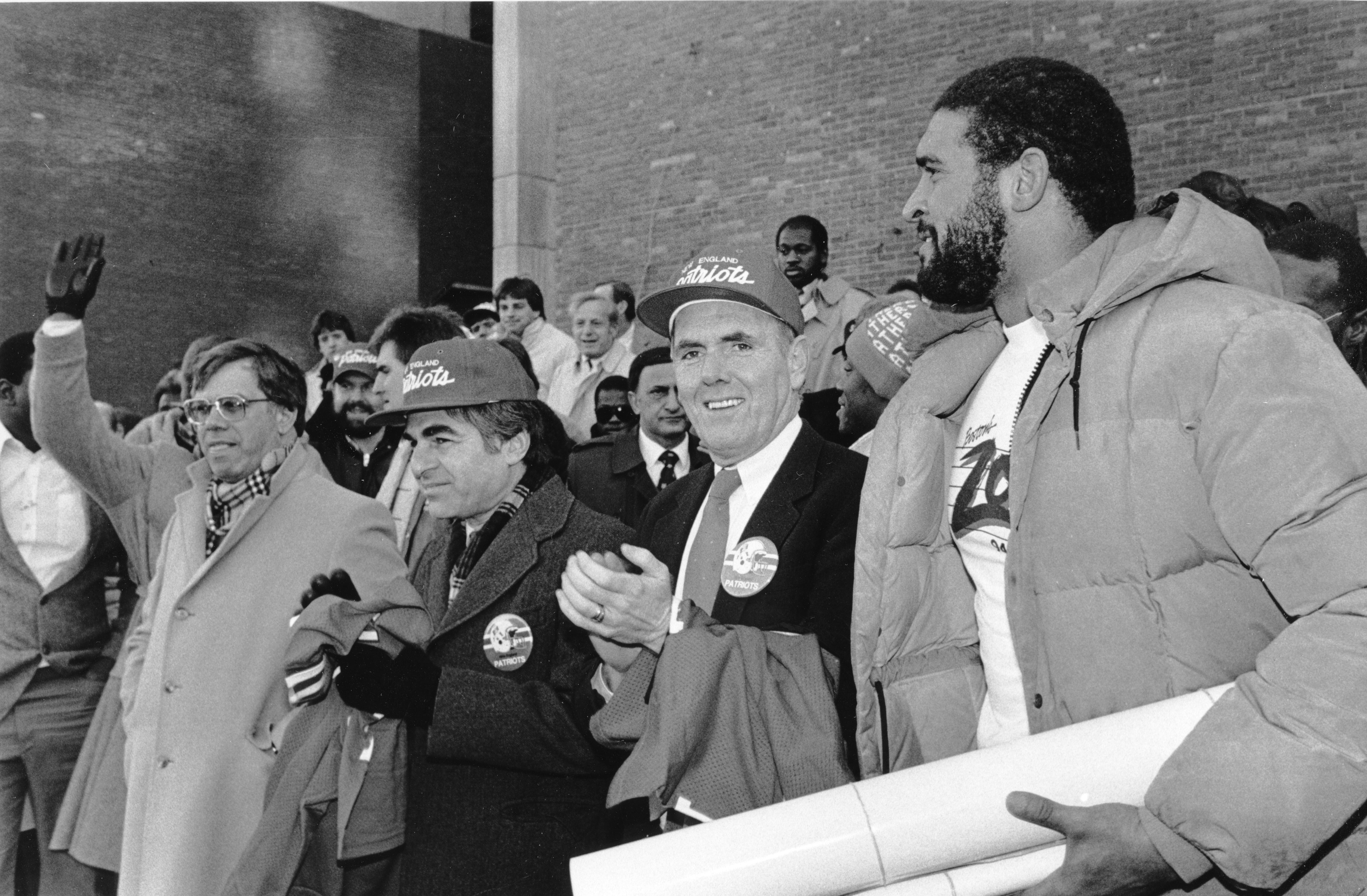
Holloway (far right) in 1985 with then-Boston City Councilor Thomas Menino (far left), Massachusetts Governor Michael Dukakis (second from left), and Boston mayor Raymond Flynn (second from right)

Brian Holloway was selected by the New England Patriots in the first round (19th overall) of the 1981 NFL draft out of Stanford University. As a rookie in 1981 he started 5 of 16 games. In the strike-shortened 1982 NFL season, Holloway started 9 of 9 games as he became the starting left offensive tackle, next to guard John Hannah, and missed only one start up to the end of the 1986 NFL season. In the 1982–83 NFL playoffs, the Patriots lost to the Miami Dolphins in a wild-card game.

They did not make the playoffs in 1983 and 1984 but did so in 1985. After beating the New York Jets in a wild-card game of the 1985–86 NFL playoffs, the Patriots beat the Los Angeles Raiders on the road in the divisional round with a strong running game, amassing 156 yards, 104 by running back Craig James behind Holloway and Hannah. The line then destroyed the Miami Dolphins' run defense on the road by accumulating 255 yards, 105 of them by James, winning the AFC title. However, they could not run over the legendary Chicago Bears defense of 1985 in Super Bowl XX, Holloway having a hard time with the formidably swift right defensive end Richard Dent, who would be named Most Valuable Player of the game.

After finishing with a won-lost record of 11–5 and winning the AFC East division, New England fell short against the Denver Broncos, led by quarterback John Elway, in a divisional round of the 1986–87 NFL playoffs.

Holloway was one of the most dominating offensive tackles in his era, as indicated in part by three Pro Bowl selections from 1983 to 1985.

=== Los Angeles Raiders ===
Brian Holloway played left offensive tackle with the Los Angeles Raiders in 1987 and 1988 after being traded to the Raiders on September 2, 1987, in exchange for the Raiders' fifth-round selection in the 1988 NFL draft. In the strike-shortened 1987 NFL season, he started eight of 12 games, but did not start in 1988, his final year in the NFL, being replaced at that position by Don Mosebar.

== Personal life ==
Holloway had a home in Stephentown, New York for over 30 years, while living at his Florida residence in Tampa. While he was in Tampa on August 31, 2013, over 500 local high school students broke into his New York house and caused damage that Holloway says exceeds $20,000 while throwing a party. In response, Holloway set up a website, www.helpmesave300.com, to reach out to those who caused the damage in a positive way; instead, he received threats from their parents. Six people were arrested September 26, 2013 in connection with the partygoers who trashed the home.

In October 2013, the Holloway home sold at foreclosure auction to the Berkshire Bank, which purchased it for $400,000. It was the sole bidder on the property. After the auction, the Albany Times Union reported that Holloway owed Berkshire Bank $1,006,348.80. He had also built up a backlog of unpaid property and school taxes, totaling $45,131.

His younger brother Jonathan Holloway was president of Rutgers University from 2020 to 2025.
