= Darius Quimby =

American law enforcement officer

- Died: January 3, 1791; Albany County, New York, US
- Police career
- Country: United States
- Allegiance: Albany County, New York
- Department: Albany County Constable's Office
- Rank: Constable

Darius Quimby was an American police officer who is recognized as the first known law enforcement officer to be killed in the line of duty in the United States. Constable Quimby worked for the Albany County Constable's Office of New York. He was killed on January 3, 1791. He may have been an unpaid peace officer.

Constable Quimby was killed while attempting to arrest a man named Whiting Sweeting of Stephentown, New York on a trespassing warrant. A 1790 census lists a Darius in the family of Ephraim Quimby there and of an age eligible to be a constable. Sweeting was convicted of murdering Constable Quimby in the July session of the New York State Supreme Court and hanged on August 26, 1791.

== Sources ==
- "Constable Darius Quimby, Albany County Constable's Office, New York". The Officer Down Memorial Page, Inc.
- https://web.archive.org/web/20090201171548/http://reservepolice.org/History_of_Reserves.htm
- https://web.archive.org/web/20140710161814/http://www.villageofshorewood.org/index.asp?Type=B_BASIC&SEC=%7B679B50AE-E6F1-4332-BB6A-FB101F9E6173%7D
