= Solomon C. Carr =

American politician

Solomon Carpenter Carr (December 19, 1830 – February 16, 1914) was an American farmer and politician.

Born in Stephentown, New York, Carr went to public school. In 1839, he moved to Milton Junction, Wisconsin Territory. He was a farmer. Carr was involved with the Wisconsin chapter of the National Grange of the Order of Patrons of Husbandry. Carr served in several town offices. In 1865 and in 1874, Carr served in the Wisconsin State Assembly and was a Republican. Carr died at his home in Milton Junction from heart problems. He was buried at Milton Junction Cemetery.
