= Search for the Super Battery =

- DVD cover
- Genre: Documentary film
- Written by: Daniel McCabe
- Directed by: Daniel McCabe
- Starring: David Pogue
- Narrated by: Jay O. Sanders
- Theme music composer: APM
- Country of origin: United States
- Original language: English

Production
- Producer: Daniel McCabe
- Cinematography: Stephen McCarthy
- Editor: Daniel McCabe
- Running time: 53 minutes
- Production companies: A NOVA production by Miles O’Brien Productions, LLC, for WGBH Boston.

Original release
- Network: PBS
- Release: February 1, 2017

Search for the Super Battery: Discover the Powerful World of Batteries is a 2017 American documentary film about energy storage and how it may help provide an environmentally friendly, or green, future. The basic mechanism of batteries, including lithium-ion types, is described. The benefits and limitations of various batteries are also presented. Details of seeking a much safer, more powerful, longer-lasting and less expensive battery, a so-called "super battery", is discussed. The broad importance of energy storage devices, in mobile phones and automobiles, and in the overall electric grid system of the United States, is examined in detail.

== Participants ==
The documentary film is narrated by Jay O. Sanders and includes the following participants (alphabetized by last name):

- Jay O. Sanders (Narrator)
- David Pogue (Host)
- Guenter Conzelmann (Argonne National Lab)
- George Crabtree (Joint Center for Energy Storage Research)
- Alexis Georgeson (Tesla Motors)
- Denise Gray (LG Chem Power)
- Theo Gray (Chemist and author)
- Daniel Kammen (University of California, Berkeley)
- Doug Kim (Southern California Edison)
- Joshua Lamb (Sandia National Labs)
- Jay Leno (1909 electric car owner)
- Greg Less (University of Michigan (Battery Lab))
- Y. Shirley Meng (UC San Diego)
- Jeff Sakamoto (University of Michigan)
- Seth Sanders (Amber Kinetics)
- Venkat Srinivasan (Lawrence Berkeley National Lab)
- Leigh Anna Steele (Sandia National Labs)
- Levi Thompson (University of Michigan)
- Lynn Trahey (Argonne National Lab)
- Steven Visco (PolyPlus Battery Company)
- Jay Whitacre (Aquion Energy)
- Mike Zimmerman (Ionic Materials)

== Summaries in the media ==
According to David Templeton of the Pittsburgh Post-Gazette, the program "walks the viewer through the science of how batteries work, returning to that theme time and again to explain variations in design to create cheaper, safer, longer-lasting batteries and energy-storage systems." Notable discoveries, featured in the program, Templeton reports, are a safe battery "made with saltwater electrolytes", as well as a safe battery "made of plastics that can use lithium metal rather than a traditional lithium ion to produce longer-lasting, safe power." Vicky Hallet of the Washington Post writes that lithium-ion batteries "gained widespread popularity because of their ability to pack a lot of energy into a lightweight package." However, such batteries – due to the thermal runaway properties of the varieties of lithium-content rechargeable cells that use lithium cobalt oxide in their positive electrodes – can potentially burst into flames. The program shows several possible ways to make batteries safer. Hallet reports that the program presents an important notion: "Batteries are evolving to do more, and do it safely. It’s powerful stuff."

== Gallery ==
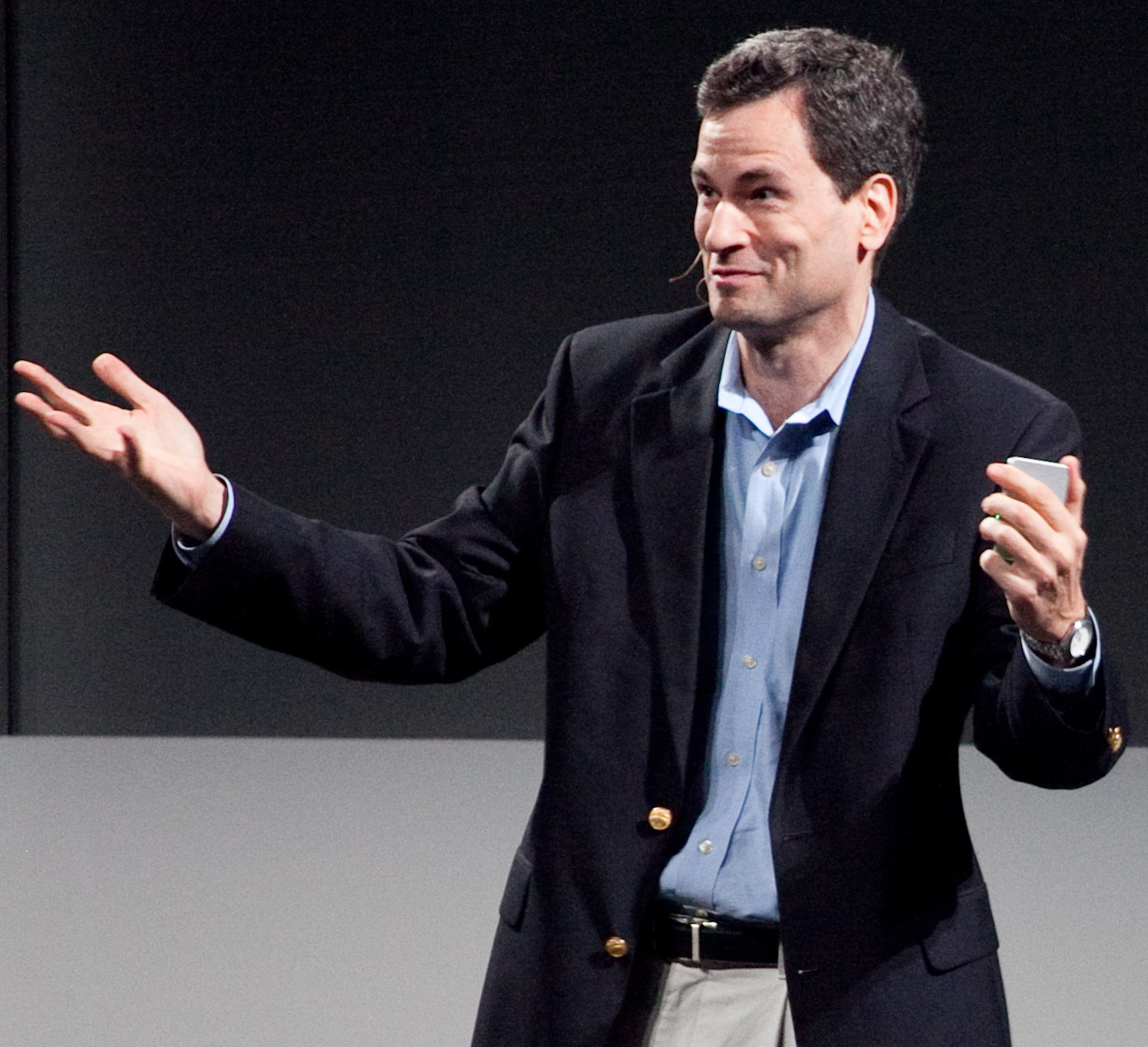
David Pogue
(Host)

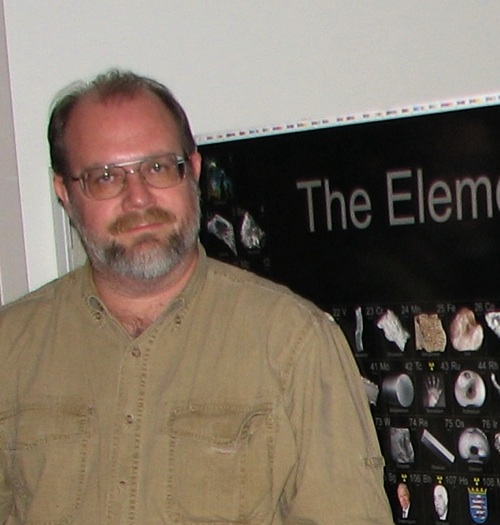
Theo Gray
(Chemist and author)

Daniel Kammen
(University of California, Berkeley)

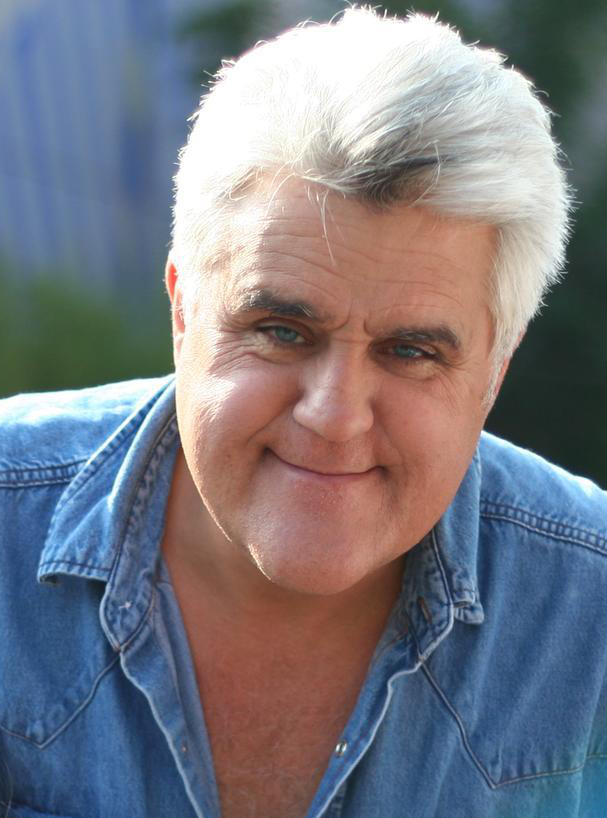
Jay Leno
(1909 electric car owner)

== See also ==
- Baker Motor Vehicle
- Battery charger
- Battery nomenclature
- Flywheel storage power system
- List of battery types
- Lithium iron phosphate battery
- Lithium polymer battery
- Lithium–sulfur battery
- Rechargeable battery
- The Mystery of Matter (2014 PBS film)
- Thermogalvanic cell
- Thermal energy storage
