= David Holloway (American football) =

American football player (born 1983)

No. 57
- Position: Linebacker

Personal information
- Born: December 4, 1983 (age 42); Stephentown, New York, U.S.
- Listed height: 6 ft 2 in (1.88 m)
- Listed weight: 229 lb (104 kg)

Career information
- College: Maryland
- NFL draft: 2007: undrafted

Career history
- Arizona Cardinals (2007); Washington Redskins (2008)*; Cleveland Browns (2008–2009)*; Jacksonville Jaguars (2009)*; Arizona Cardinals (2009)*
- * Offseason or practice squad member only

David Alexander Holloway (born December 4, 1983) is an American former football linebacker. He was signed by the Arizona Cardinals as an undrafted free agent in 2007. He played college football at Maryland.

Holloway was also a member of the Washington Redskins, Cleveland Browns and Jacksonville Jaguars. He is the son of former NFL offensive lineman Brian Holloway.

== Professional football career ==
=== Arizona Cardinals ===
Holloway Signed with the Arizona Cardinals in 2007.

=== Washington Redskins ===
Holloway signed with the Washington Redskins in 2008.

=== Cleveland Browns ===
Holloway signed with the Cleveland Browns in 2008. On July 26, 2009, Holloway was released.

=== Jacksonville Jaguars ===
Holloway signed with the Jacksonville Jaguars on August 4, 2009. He was waived on August 7.

=== Second stint with Cardinals ===
Holloway re-signed with the Arizona Cardinals on August 26, 2009. He was waived on September 4, 2009.

== Personal life ==
His father, Brian Holloway, was a Pro Bowl offensive lineman in the NFL in the 1980s. His maternal grandfather, John McKenzie, played in the National Hockey League. He is a 2002 graduate of The Albany Academy in Albany, New York.
