= Bayannur Wulanyiligeng Wind Farm =

Wind farm in Inner Mongolia, China

- Country: People's Republic of China
- Location: Urat Middle Banner, Inner Mongolia, China
- Status: Operational

Power generation
- Nameplate capacity: 300 MW

Bayannur Wulanyiligeng Wind Farm is a wind farm in Urat Middle Banner, Inner Mongolia, China. The carbon emissions reduced from this wind farm is 894,569 metric tonnes CO_{2} equivalent per annum. It is one of the largest in the world.
