= SatCon Technology Corporation =

- Type: Public
- Traded as: OTC:SATCQ; Nasdaq: SATC
- Industry: Technology Semiconductor – Integrated Circuits
- Founded: 1985; 41 years ago
- Defunct: 2013
- Headquarters: Boston, Massachusetts, United States
- Key people: David B. Eisenhaure (CEO, president, director); Michael C. Turmelle (CFO, Chief Operating Officer)
- Products: Power conversion solutions, utility-ready solar PV system
- Revenue: $129.01M (2012.7.30)
- Number of employees: 246 (2012.7.30)
- Website: www.satcon.com/en/home

Satcon Technology Corporation was an energy and power company originally based in Cambridge, and later Boston, Massachusetts. Its markets include the utility, hybrid vehicle, ship building, industrial automation, semiconductor processing, and defense.

Mike Turmelle and Dave Eisenhaure left their positions in 2007 and 2008 respectively. They were replaced by Steve Rhoades and Aaron Gormolak. Mister Rhoades remained CEO until SatCon’s bankruptcy in 2012.

Satcon filed for bankruptcy protection under Chapter 11 of the United States Bankruptcy Code on October 17, 2012 and it announced to change to liquidate under Chapter 7 on February 7, 2013. As part of the settlement Perfect Galaxy and Great Wall purchased the company's assets including all Satcon Intellectual Property and Patents.

== History ==
In 1985 SatCon Technology Corporation was founded by Dave Eisenhaure, formerly of MIT/Draper Laboratory, to develop, market, and sell products required by the world’s growing need for cleaner and lower-cost energy and power. In 1992 the company’s CEO Dave Eisenhaure and CFO Mike Turmelle took the company public on the Nasdaq exchange (NASDAQ:SATC). After the company became public, it acquired eight private companies and one public company. The two most notable of these acquisitions were the former Westinghouse Electric Vehicle Group, which was acquired from Northrop Grumman, and Inverpower, a public Canadian company. These acquisitions and the parent company were reorganized into a diverse organization with four plants in the U.S. and Canada. SatCon provided products and services to major international companies, including Chrysler, General Motors, Ford, Litton, Fuel Cell Energy, Applied Materials, as well as major divisions of the U.S. armed forces. SatCon also created Beacon Power as a separate public company to commercialize flywheel energy storage products. Products developed by SatCon have contributed to the advancement of the utility, hybrid vehicle, ship building, industrial automation, semiconductor processing, and defense markets. SatCon is particularly well known for its work in advanced electric drives; in the technology of inverters for smart grid and photovoltaic applications; and in the development of light-weight, high-power electronics, which contributed to the development of practical hybrid and electric vehicles.

In 1995 SatCon and Chrysler were awarded the Discover Award for innovation in automotive engineering. This award was granted for the development of the drivetrain for Chrysler’s Patriot Race Car. The Patriot Race Car was built as a testbed for a turbine-electric flywheel hybrid drive train with a maximum output of 750 horsepower. SatCon was the prime contractor, designing and manufacturing the drive train and developing the needed technologies for its implementation. SatCon and Chrysler were nominated for and ultimately selected from numerous candidates for this award by a committee of automotive experts assembled by Discover Magazine.

In 2003, SatCon introduced the first 100 KW PV inverter in a single cabinet, PowerGate, and in the next five years introduced the 225 KW, 500 KW, and 1 MW series Inverters that convert the direct current (DC) power into usable alternating (AC)

Mike Turmelle, Dave Eisenhaure and Jim Kirtley have formed a new company TEK-Energy Systems. TEK-Energy Systems is composed of key members of the SatCon Technology Corporation team

== Products ==
The company mainly has three production lines: Solstice, a power harvesting and array management solution for utility-class power plants; Prism Platform, an integrated 1 or 1.25MW solution for utility-scale solar PV installations; Equinox, a power conversion solution for grid-connected electrical power. Other products include Equinox LC; PowerGate Plus; PV View Plus and Satcon Smart Combiner, monitoring service via Internet; Energy Equity Protection and Other Legacy Power Products (such as static disconnect switches).
