= Compensated pulsed alternator =

Form of power supply

A compensated pulsed alternator, also known by the portmanteau compulsator, is a form of power supply.

As the name suggests, it is an alternator that is "compensated" (see below) to make it better at delivering pulses of electrical energy than a normal alternator.

== Description and operation ==
The principle is very similar to an alternator, except the rotor is usually kept spinning by its inertia (having been "spun up" by an external motor, or the compulsator itself having been used in reverse as an AC motor) and the small matter of the "compensation". The compulsator is used like a capacitor, to gather energy from a low-power source and store it, then generate a high-power output for a short period.

The windings of a compulsator are different from those of a normal alternator in being designed for minimal inductance. This allows the current in the windings to change very rapidly, which is why this "compensation" makes it better at delivering pulses.

The kinetic energy of a rotating object depends on the mass of the object, the shape of the object, and the square of the speed of rotation. Therefore, compulsators tend to have very light rotors spinning very fast in order to store the most energy in the available mass, and because too much mass in the rotor causes problems with the magnitude of centripetal force required to prevent the rotor from flying apart.

== Usage ==
Compulsators are popular choices for high-end railgun power supplies.

One possibility being considered is to build an electric tank using a conventional diesel engine for propulsion and to charge a compulsator. The compulsator would be used to power a railgun, and potentially other pulsed energy weapons (particularly electronic warfare systems); also, the compulsator could be used in non-pulsed mode to drive a tank with electric motors for limited periods as a kind of "quiet mode", which could be useful in urban combat.
