= Stephentown, New York =

- Town
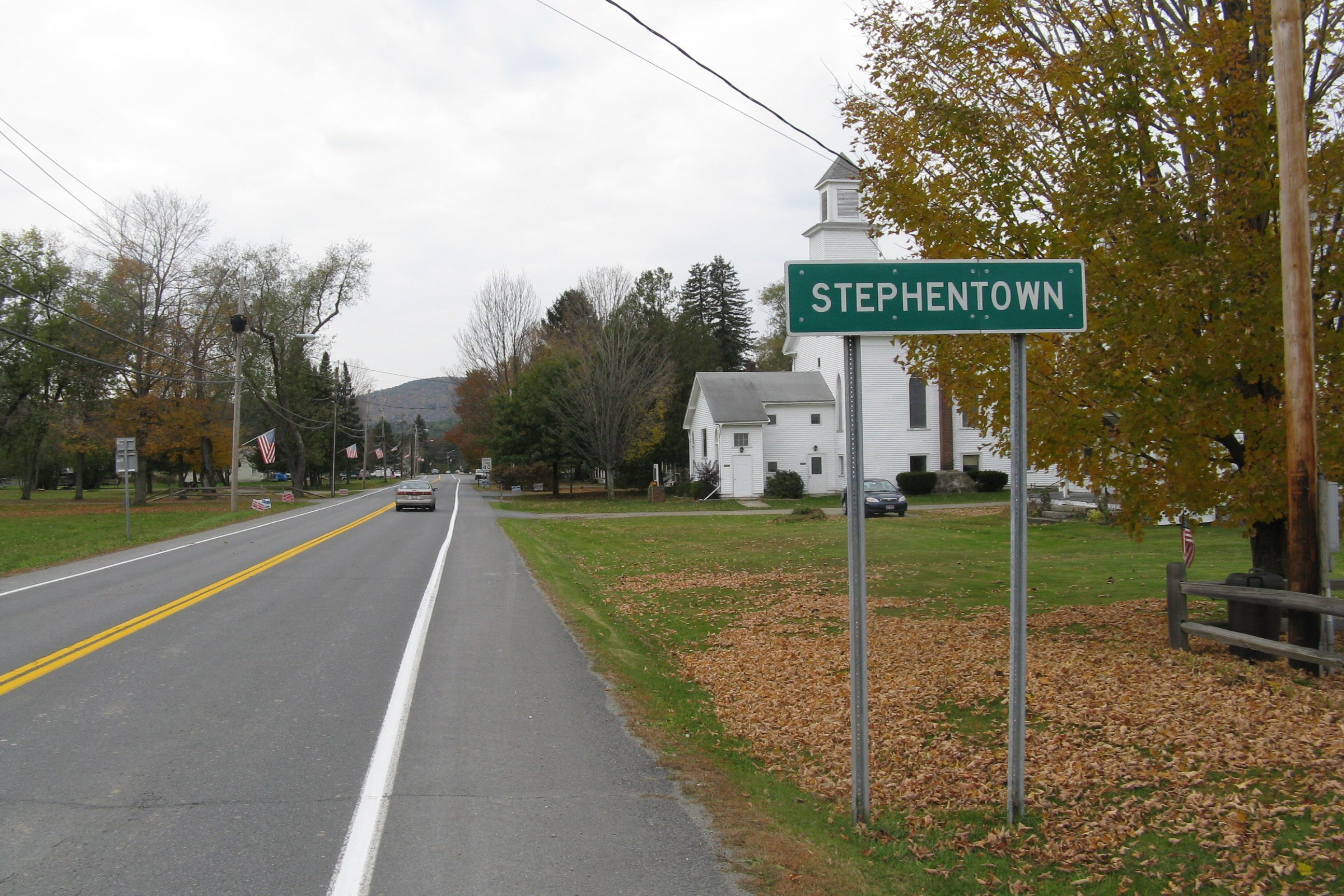
- Entering Stephentown

- Location in Rensselaer County and the state of New York.
- Coordinates: 42°32′40″N 73°24′58″W
- Country: United States
- State: New York
- County: Rensselaer

Area
  - Total: 58.09 sq mi (150.44 km^{2})
  - Land: 57.89 sq mi (149.93 km^{2})
  - Water: 0.20 sq mi (0.51 km^{2})
- Elevation: 1,063 ft (324 m)

Population (2020)
  - Total: 2,791
- Time zone: UTC-5 (Eastern (EST))
  - Summer (DST): UTC-4 (EDT)
- ZIP codes: 12168-12169
- Area code: 518
- FIPS code: 36-71102
- GNIS feature ID: 0979523
- Website: Town website

Stephentown is a town in Rensselaer County, New York, United States. The population was 2,791 at the 2020 census. The town, which was originally Jericho Hallow in the Massachusetts Bay Colony, was renamed for Stephen Van Rensselaer. The town is located in the southeastern corner of the county, and has a sign proclaiming it to be the only Stephentown on Earth.

== History ==
Stephentown was first settled around 1765. The town was formed in 1788, from the East Manor of Rensselaerwyck District. The Stephentown pioneers were from New England, primarily Rhode Island and Connecticut.

== Geography ==
According to the United States Census Bureau, the town has a total area of 58.1 square miles (150 km^{2}), of which 58.0 square miles (150 km^{2}) is land and 0.1 square miles (0.26 km^{2}) (0.16%) is water. The southern town line is the border with Columbia County, New York, and the eastern town boundary is the border of Massachusetts. The western and central portions of the town are part of the Rensselaer Plateau.

== Demographics ==
Historical population
Census	Pop.	Note	%±
1820	2,592		—
1830	2,716		4.8%
1840	2,753		1.4%
1850	2,622		−4.8%
1860	2,311		−11.9%
1870	2,133		−7.7%
1880	1,986		−6.9%
1890	1,764		−11.2%
1900	1,545		−12.4%
1910	1,289		−16.6%
1920	1,109		−14.0%
1930	1,093		−1.4%
1940	1,181		8.1%
1950	1,295		9.7%
1960	1,361		5.1%
1970	1,731		27.2%
1980	2,031		17.3%
1990	2,521		24.1%
2000	2,873		14.0%
2010	2,903		1.0%
2020	2,791		−3.9%
U.S. Decennial Census

As of the census of 2010, there were 2,903 people, 1,141 households, and 838 families residing in the town. The population density was 49.8 inhabitants per square mile (19.2/km^{2}). There were 1,339 housing units at an average density of 23.1 per square mile (8.9/km^{2}). The racial makeup of the town was 96.7% White, 0.31% African American, 0.21% Native American, 0.14% Asian, 0.07% Pacific Islander, and 0.77% from two or more races. Hispanic or Latino of any race were 3.11% of the population.

There were 1,141 households, out of which 35.5% had children under the age of 18 living with them, 59.5% were married couples living together, 8.2% had a female householder with no husband present, and 27.2% were non-families. 21.0% of all households were made up of individuals, and 7.2% had someone living alone who was 65 years of age or older. The average household size was 2.54 and the average family size was 2.94.

In the town, the population was spread out, with 25.7% under the age of 18, 6.8% from 18 to 24, 31.1% from 25 to 44, 26.1% from 45 to 64, and 10.4% who were 65 years of age or older. The median age was 38 years. For every 100 females, there were 96.0 males. For every 100 females age 18 and over, there were 99.3 males.

The median income for a household in the town was $59,769, and the median income for a family was $61,347. Males had a median income of $31,535 versus $26,611 for females. The per capita income for the town was $25,352. About 5.7% of families and 6.6% of the population were below the poverty line, including 9.0% of those under age 18 and 7.0% of those age 65 or over.

== Communities and locations in Stephentown ==
- Cherry Plain State Park – Only a small southern section of the state park is in the northern part of the town.
- East Nassau – The eastern section of the Village of East Nassau is located at the western town line.
- Garfield – A hamlet southwest of Stephentown village.
- North Stephentown – A hamlet near the northern town line on Route 22.
- Stephentown – The hamlet of Stephentown is in the eastern part of the town.
- Stephentown Center – A hamlet northwest of Stephentown village. (It was formerly called "Mechanicville", which now refers to a city in Saratoga County.)
- Stephentown Flats – A former community south of Stephentown village.
- West Stephentown – A hamlet near the western town line.
- Wyomanock – A hamlet south of Stephentown village on Route 22.

== Notable people ==
- Smith A. Boughton, leader of the Anti-Rent War
- Ezra S. Carr, California academic
- Solomon C. Carr, Wisconsin state legislator and farmer
- Roy Face, Major League Baseball relief pitcher with the Pittsburgh Pirates, Detroit Tigers and Montreal Expos, who pioneered the role of the modern closer
- Brian Holloway, National Football League offensive tackle
- David Holloway, National Football League linebacker
- Amaziah B. James, Judge and Congressman from New York
- Hosea Moffitt, Congressman from New York
- Zadock Pratt, Congressman from New York
- Darius Quimby, first peace officer in the United States to be killed in the line of duty

== Electric power facilities ==
=== Stephentown Spindle ===
Pursuant to Section 68 of the Public Service Law, Stephentown Regulating Services LLC (SRS) (now operating as Stephentown Spindle LLC (SS)) was granted a Certificate of Public Convenience and Necessity for a 20-megawatt (MW) flywheel-based energy storage facility in 2009. It went in-service in 2010. There are 200 flywheels set within 20 pods on 5-acres that spin at high rates of speed (8,000 rpm to 16,000 rpm) storing energy as rotational energy. Each flywheel weighs 5 tons. The flywheels are energized by and discharge their energy into the New York State transmission system.

The project was initially financed in 2010 with a $43 million loan from the federal Department of Energy, however, this amount was reduced to $25 million in 2012 when SS acquired the SRS assets. The company does not sell energy into the NYISO's electric wholesale market or capacity market, however, it does receive revenue from the ancillary services market for providing frequency regulation service. The stakeholder-driven policy at the NYISO excludes the facility from providing power into the NYISO's wholesale electric and capacity markets because it does not meet minimum criteria - a minimum of 5 minutes or 1 hour - for sustained energy delivery. The regulation service market in the NYISO provides revenue via two streams, a main regulation capacity price ($/MWh over a five-minute interval in the real-time market) based on a day-ahead and real-time market price, and a movement (performance) award ($/MW). For example, if the facility were able to provide its 20 MW output for 12 hours of the day at an average regulation price of $11 per MWh the facility would receive $963,600 a year. Revenue received from the performance fee, which averaged about $2.30 per MW in Q2 of 2018, is a much smaller proportion of annual revenue.

It is the first commercial flywheel project in the United States to provide frequency regulation service. The only other comparable utility-scale energy storage facilities in New York are NYPA's 1,100 MW pumped storage facility at Blenheim-Gilboa and NYPA's 240 MW Lewiston pumped storage facility at Niagara Falls. For a power comparison, the capital region's peak summer demand was 2,032 MW in 2017.
