= Voltage optimisation =

Voltage optimisation is a term given to the systematic controlled reduction in the voltages received by an energy consumer to reduce energy use, power demand and reactive power demand. While some voltage 'optimisation' devices have a fixed voltage adjustment, others electronically regulate the voltage automatically.

Voltage optimisation systems are typically installed in series with the mains electrical supply to a building, allowing all its electrical equipment to benefit from an optimised supply.

== Background ==
Voltage optimisation is an electrical energy saving technique which is mainly installed in series with the mains electricity supply to provide a reduced supply voltage for the site's equipment. Typically, voltage optimisation can improve power quality by balancing phase voltages and filtering harmonics and transients from the supply, although not always. Voltage optimisers are essentially transformers used to deliver power at a reduced voltage from the raw mains supply.

The term voltage optimisation is frequently misused, as the term implies some form of selective voltage reduction, which will improve the energy consumption within a building, whereas generally these units consists of a transformer within a box, offering no selectivity and dropping voltage on all supplies, whether this would offer a commercial benefit or not. Some VO units have been installed on high frequency lighting circuits, offering little or no commercial benefit, therefore one must be careful when the term is used.

Most VO units are installed in commercial premises, in between the raw mains transformer and main low voltage distribution board. However, this provides for no selectivity and in electrical engineering terms is considered a poor solution. A full study should be undertaken by the facilities manager and VO company, to select which supplies could benefit the owner by reducing the voltage and which supplies would give no commercial benefit. This way the owner only purchases a VO of the correct size and not one that's for all supplies. Installing a VO unit to 'optimise' all supplies would give a longer return on investment, a higher capital outlay and makes little commercial sense.

=== United Kingdom ===
The declared low voltage electricity supply in the United Kingdom as per the Electrical Safety, Quality and Continuity Regulations 2002, is now 230 V with a tolerance of +10% to -6%. This means that supply voltage can theoretically be anywhere between 216 V and 253 V depending on local conditions. However, the average voltage supplied from the national grid (in mainland UK) is 242 V, compared to the typical European voltage of 218-222 V. (The average supply voltage in Northern Ireland is around 239 V, and 235 V in the Republic of Ireland.)

Older electrical equipment manufactured for the UK was rated at 240 V, and older equipment manufactured for Continental Europe was rated at 220 V (see Worldwide Mains Voltages). New equipment should be designed for 230 V. A mixture of equipment is likely to be found in older premises. All equipment placed on the market within the E.U. since voltage harmonisation in 1995 should operate satisfactorily at voltages within the range 230 V +/-10%. Equipment rated at 220 V should operate satisfactorily down to 200 V. By efficiently bringing supply voltages to the lower end of the statutory voltage range, voltage optimisation technology could yield average energy savings of around 13%.

The higher the voltage the higher the power consumption in the case of a pure resistance load. A reduction in voltage does not affect the energy used by the domestic appliances which use resistive loads except in devices such as kettles and toasters which will take longer to do their job due to atmospheric losses. The main commercial benefit when installing VO units, is on inductive loads, like motors which run pumps, fans and the like. In the home, the potential energy saving can be up to 12% on electricity bills. A VO device will lower the voltage to the most efficient level to maximise the savings on electricity consumption, so you may notice certain things taking a little longer, such as a kettle may take a little longer to boil.

It is a common misconception that fridges and freezers do not provide savings through voltage optimisation because they are fitted with a thermostat. Fridges and freezers operate completely differently from resistive heating devices. If a resistive heating device is driven from a higher voltage the result is heat which is helpful in its intended purpose (heating). If a fridge or freezer is driven from a higher voltage the result is also heat however this is not helpful in its intended purpose (cooling). The compressor motor power output is reduced slightly by voltage optimisation so the fridge/freezer thermostat will keep the motor on a little longer however overall the effect is for the motor to run slightly longer at much lower losses. Tests at Manchester university showed a 10 °C reduction in motor temperature under voltage optimisation due to the reduced losses in the motor.

== Common power quality problems ==
=== Overvoltage ===
Overvoltage refers to voltage higher than the voltage at which equipment is designed to operate most effectively. It can cause a reduction in equipment lifetime and increases in energy consumed with no improvement in performance. A commentary on the Wiring Regulations BS 7671 makes the following statements in relation to overvoltage: "A 230 V rated lamp used at 240 will achieve only 55% of its rated life" (referring to incandescent lamps) and "A 230 V linear appliance used on a 240 V supply will take 4.3% more current and will consume almost 9% more energy".

Various technologies can be used to avoid overvoltage, but it must be done so efficiently so that energy savings resulting from using the correct voltage are not offset by energy wasted within the device used to do so. Reliability is also important, and there are potential problems inherent in running full incoming power through electro-mechanical devices such as servo-controlled variable autotransformers.

Undervoltage refers to voltage lower than the voltage at which equipment is designed to operate most effectively. If the design of the VO does not take into consideration voltage drop over distance to remote power users, then this may lead to premature equipment failure, failure to start up, increased temperature in the case of motor windings and loss of service.

=== Harmonics ===
Harmonics are current and voltage waveforms at multiples of the fundamental frequency of the 50 Hz (or 60 Hz) main supply. Harmonics are caused by non-linear loads, which include power supplies for computer equipment, variable speed drives, and discharge lighting. "Triplen" harmonics (odd multiples of the third harmonic) result when phase voltages are not balanced in a three phase power systems and add in the neutral, causing wasteful currents to flow.

The possible effects if the level of harmonics, known as total harmonic distortion becomes too high include damage to sensitive electronic equipment and reduction in the efficiency of the HV transformer. The efficiency of electrical loads can be improved by attenuating harmonics at the supply, or by preventing their generation. Some voltage optimisation devices also mitigate harmonics, reducing losses associated with harmonic content on the electrical system.

=== Transients ===
Transients are large, very brief and potentially destructive increases in voltage. Their causes include lightning strikes, switching of large electrical loads such as motors, transformers and electrical drives, and by switching between power generation sources to balance supply and demand. Although they typically only last thousandths or millionths of a second, transients can damage electronic systems causing data loss, degrading equipment components and shortening equipment life. Some voltage optimisation devices include transient protection.

=== Phase voltage imbalance ===
Industrial and commercial sites are supplied with 3-phase electricity. Imbalance between the phases causes problems such as heating in motors and existing wiring, leading to wasteful energy consumption. Some voltage optimisation devices are able to improve balance on the building's electrical supply, reducing losses and improving the longevity of three phase induction motors.

=== Power dips ===
Power dips are reductions in voltage, mostly of short duration (<300 ms) but sometimes longer. They may cause a number of problems with equipment, for example contactors and relays may drop out causing machinery to stop. There are a number of low-voltage ride-through techniques including Uninterruptible Power Supplies, the use of capacitors on low voltage DC control circuits, the use of capacitors on the DC bus of Variable Speed Drives. Care must be taken that Voltage Optimisation measures do not reduce the voltage to an extent that equipment is more vulnerable to power dips.

=== Power factor and reactive power ===
The power factor of an electrical supply is the ratio of the real power to the apparent power of the supply. It is the useful power used by the site divided by the total power that is drawn. The latter includes power that is unusable, so a power factor of 1 is desirable. A low power factor would mean that the electricity supplier would effectively supply more energy than the consumer's bill would indicate, and suppliers are allowed to charge for low power factors.

Reactive power is the name given to unusable power. It does no work in the electrical system, but is used to charge capacitors or produce a magnetic field around the field of an inductor. Reactive power needs to be generated and distributed through a circuit to provide sufficient real power to enable processes to run. Reactive power increases significantly with increasing voltage as the reactance of equipment increases. Correcting this with voltage optimisation will therefore lead to a reduction in reactive power and improvement in power factor.

== Effects on electrical loads ==
A common misconception as far as Voltage Optimisation is concerned is to assume that a reduction in voltage will result in an increase in current and therefore constant power. Whilst this is true for certain fixed-power loads, most sites have a diversity of loads that will benefit to a greater or lesser extent with energy savings aggregating across a site as a whole. The benefit to typical equipment at three phase sites is discussed below.

=== Three phase motors ===
Three phase induction motors are probably the most common type of three phase load and are used in a variety of equipment including refrigeration, pumps, air conditioning, conveyor drives as well as their more obvious applications. The de-rating effects of overvoltage and three phase imbalance on AC motors are well known. Excessive overvoltage results in saturation of the iron core, wasting energy through eddy currents and increased hysteresis losses. Drawing excessive current results in excess heat output due to copper losses. The additional stress of overvoltage on motors will decrease motor lifetime.

Avoiding overvoltage high enough to cause saturation does not reduce efficiency so substantial energy savings can be made through reducing iron and copper losses. However, motors designed for the nominal voltage (e.g. 400 V) should be able to cope with normal variation in voltage within the supply limits(+/-10%) without saturation, so this is unlikely to be a significant problem.

Reducing voltage to an induction motor will slightly affect the motor speed as slip will increase, but speed is mainly a function of the supply frequency and the number of poles. Motor efficiency is optimum at reasonable load (typically 75%) and at the designed voltage, and will fall off slightly with small variations either side of this voltage. Larger variations affect efficiency more.

Very lightly loaded motors (<25%) and small motors benefit most from reducing voltage.

For the case of motors driven by Variable Speed Drives, when the input voltage is reduced, there will be a proportionate reduction of the output voltage from the VSD and the motor will draw less current and eventually consume less power. However, if the motor is running on high load (>80%), the reduction in voltage will result in reduced torque and motor will end up drawing more current and power.

=== Lighting ===
When lighting loads are in use for a high proportion of the time, energy savings on lighting equipment are extremely valuable. When voltage is reduced, incandescent lighting will see a large decrease in power drawn, a large decrease in light output and an increase in lifetime, as the previous extracts from the Electricians Guide illustrate. Since the decrease in light output will exceed the decrease in power drawn, the energy efficiency - luminous efficacy - of the lighting will drop.

However, other types of lighting can also benefit from improved power quality, including systems with resistive or reactive ballasts. Fluorescent & discharge lighting is more efficient than incandescent lighting. Fluorescent lighting with conventional magnetic ballasts will see a reduced power consumption, but also a reduced lumen output from the lamp. Fluorescent lamps on modern electronic ballasts will use approximately the same power and give the same light.

To provide the same wattage at the reduced voltage will require a greater current and increase cable losses. However, lighting controllers and ballasts are responsible for generating high levels of harmonic distortion, which can be filtered with some types of voltage optimiser, in addition reducing the need for lighting controllers. A common concern is that some lighting will fail to strike at lower voltages. However, this should not occur since the aim of voltage optimisation is not simply to reduce the voltage as far as possible, but to bring it to the service level voltage at which it was designed to operate most efficiently.

=== Heating ===
Heaters will consume less power, but give less heat. Thermostatically controlled space or water heaters will consume less power while running, but will have to run for longer in each hour to produce the required output, resulting in no saving.

=== Switched mode power supplies ===
Switched mode power supplies will use the same power as before, but will draw a slightly greater current to achieve this, with slightly increased cable losses, and slight risk of the increased current tripping MCBs.

== Energy savings ==
The energy savings achieved by Voltage Optimization are an aggregation of the improved efficiency of all equipment across a site in response to the improvements in the power quality problems outlined above. It possible technique for savings in energy consumption in certain circumstances.

Research in Taiwan suggested that, for an industrial supply, for voltage reduction upstream of the transformer, there is a 0.241% decrease of energy consumption when the voltage is decreased by 1%, and an increase of 0.297% when the voltage is increased by 1%. This assumed a mixture of loads including 7% fluorescent lighting, 0.5% incandescent lighting, 12.5% three phase air conditioners, 5% motors, 22.5% small 3-phase motors, 52.5% large 3-phase motors.

It is likely that a modern installation would have less opportunity: almost no incandescent lighting, partly high-frequency fluorescent lighting (no saving), some variable speed drives (no saving), higher motor efficiencies (so less waste to save). A northern European installation would not have the large number of small single phase motors for air conditioning.

Energy saving is possible with older lighting, at the expense of lower light output, (e.g. incandescent or fluorescent and discharge lighting with inefficient ballast or control gear). Therefore, older commercial and office premises may save more than modern buildings or industrial sites. However modern lighting systems (typically LED) will save significantly more energy due to higher efficiency than energy saved on older lighting systems following installation of a voltage optimiser.

Obtaining energy savings with a voltage optimiser used with modern lighting systems is very questionable. Modern electronic switching controllers for LED or fluorescent lighting systems are designed to run the lights at optimal light output and longevity with high efficiency. Variations in supply voltage will therefore not make any difference to the overall energy use of these types of lights. However, there exist types of low cost LED and fluorescent lamp controllers which reduce the voltage by shedding energy as heat (e.g. multiple LEDs in series with a series resistance). Varying the supply voltage would affect the energy used by these types of lights, but these types of lamps are generally low power and the light output would also be affected.

=== Worked example ===
A typical 100 watt incandescent lamp has an efficiency of no more than 17.5 lumens per watt (l/W) and will therefore produce 1750 lumens at its rated voltage. A typical modern LED lamp has an efficiency of about 150 lumens per watt, and therefore requires no more than 12 watts for the same light output. According to Lamp rerating formulae, reducing the voltage across an incandescent lamp by 10% reduces the power (and therefore energy) by about 16% and reduces the light output by about 31%.

Therefore, a voltage optimiser that reduces the voltage on an incandescent lamp by 10%, will reduce the energy by 16% and light output by 31%, producing only 1210 lumens and consuming 84 watts. Changing the incandescent lamp to an LED lamp with similar light output would have reduce the consumption more effectively, down to 12 watts. Furthermore, since the light output is reduced by so much, higher savings could be made by changing to a 75 watt incandescent lamp without a voltage optimiser (1312.5 lumens assuming 17.5 L/W). The LED lamp could also be reduced in size to 8W, if only 1210 lumens is required.

== See also ==
- Energy conservation
- Efficient energy use
- Power conditioner
- Voltage scaling
