= Daniel Sabin =

Daniel Douglas Sabin from Danvers, Massachusetts, USA was named Fellow of the Institute of Electrical and Electronics Engineers (IEEE) in 2016 "for leadership in power quality database management and analysis software". He was a principal engineer with Electrotek Concepts when he was elevated to Fellow.

Sabin's research focused on developing automatic computer software to combine measurements from power quality monitors & microprocessor relays, distribution circuit models, and geographic information system (GIS) to provide automatic fault location based on reactance calculations.

Sabin chaired the IEEE Standards Coordinating Committee on Power Quality (SCC-22) from 2008 to 2009. This committee was responsible for coordinating IEEE activities related to the quality of electric power as it affects power equipment, power consumers, electric utilities, electric power systems, and telecommunications systems.

From 2017 to 2018, Sabin chaired the Transmission & Distribution Committee of the IEEE Power & Energy Society (PES). This committee's scope within IEEE focuses on power capacitors, passive harmonic filters, electric power distribution, HVDC, FACTS, power quality, dynamic voltage restoration (DVR) technology, and overhead line design, construction, design, & safety. He acted as the committee's Vice Chair for Standards from 2021 to 2025.

In 2018, he received the IEEE PES Award for Excellence in Power Distribution Engineering for "contributions in power quality monitoring and related indicators for fault location in distributions systems".

In 2024, Sabin was with Schneider Electric and was the chair of the IEEE PES Working Group on Power Quality Data Interchange Format (PQDIF) when he was awarded an IEEE Standards Association Standards Medallion for "outstanding leadership in the many evolutions of IEEE 1159.3™, Power Quality Data Interchange Format (PQDIF)."

Sabin was the Vice Chair of the IEEE PES External Proposal Management Committee from 2021-2025, a role for which he received a IEEE PES Technical Council Distinguished Service Award in 2025 for "significant leadership and contribution to external proposal management."

Sabin was awarded a US patent in 2024 for "Systems and methods for automatically characterizing disturbances in an electrical system". With Jon Bickel, he was awarded a US patent in 2023 for "Systems and methods for analyzing effects of electrical perturbations on equipment in an electrical system".
