= Uninterruptible power supply =

Electrical device that uses batteries to prevent any interruption of power flow

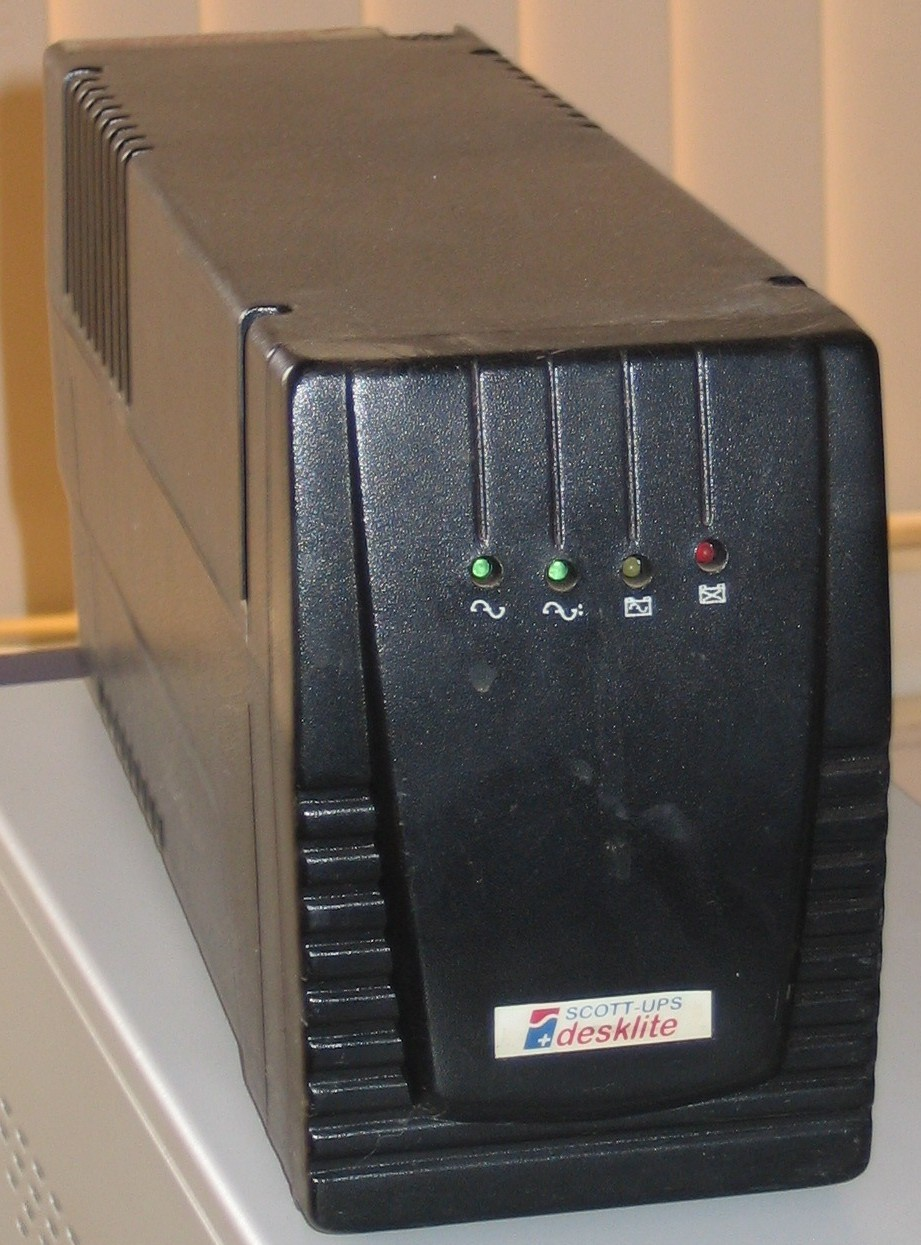
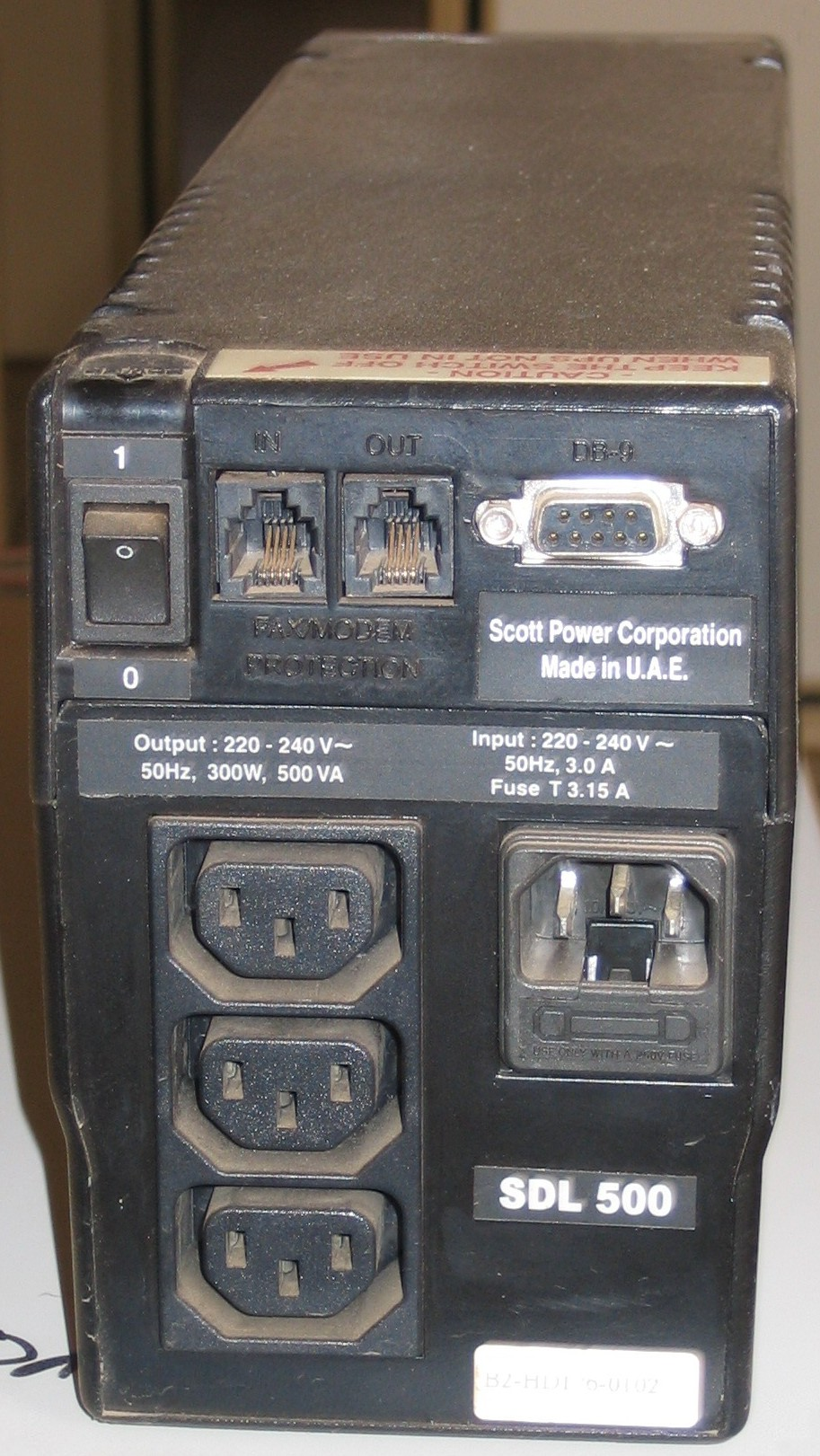
A tower type UPS with one IEC 60320 C14 input and three C13 outlets

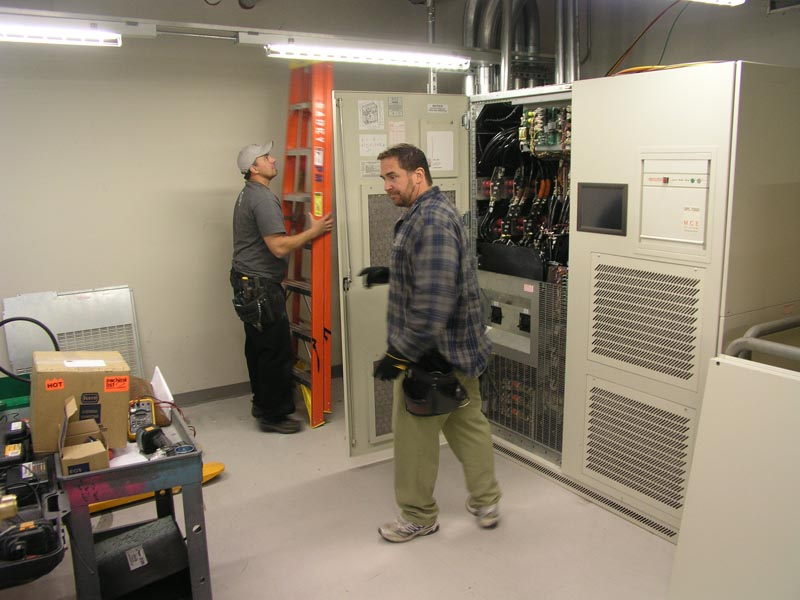
A large data-center-scale UPS being installed by electricians

An uninterruptible power supply (UPS) or uninterruptible power source is an electrical apparatus that provides emergency power to a load when the input power source or mains power fails. A UPS differs from an auxiliary or emergency power system or standby generator in that it will provide near-instantaneous protection from input power interruptions, by supplying energy stored in batteries, supercapacitors, or flywheels.

The on-battery run-time of most uninterruptible power sources is relatively short (typically ranging from 5 to 15 minutes) but sufficient to start a standby power source or properly shut down the protected equipment. It is a type of continual power system. A UPS is typically used to protect hardware such as computers, data centers, telecommunication equipment or other electrical equipment where an unexpected power disruption could cause injuries, fatalities, serious business disruption or data loss. UPS units range in size from units designed to protect a single computer without a video monitor (around 200 volt-ampere rating) to large units powering entire data centers or buildings.

== Common power problems ==
The primary role of any UPS is to provide short-term power when the input power source fails. However, most UPS units are also capable in varying degrees of correcting common utility power problems:

1. Voltage spike or sustained overvoltage
2. Momentary or sustained reduction in input voltage
3. Voltage sag
4. Noise, defined as a high frequency transient or oscillation, usually injected into the line by nearby equipment
5. Instability of the mains frequency
6. Harmonic distortion, defined as a departure from the ideal sinusoidal waveform expected on the line

Some manufacturers of UPS units categorize their products in accordance with the number of power-related problems they address.

A UPS unit may also introduce problems with electric power quality. To prevent this, a UPS should be selected not only by capacity but also by the quality of power that is required by the equipment that is being supplied.

== Technologies ==
The three general categories of modern UPS systems are on-line, line-interactive and standby:

- An online UPS uses a "double conversion" method of accepting AC input, rectifying to DC for passing through the rechargeable battery (or battery strings), then inverting back to 120 V/230 V AC for powering the protected equipment.
- A line-interactive UPS maintains the inverter in line and redirects the battery's DC current path from the normal charging mode to supplying current when power is lost.
- In a standby ("off-line") system the load is powered directly by the input power and the backup power circuitry is only invoked when the utility power fails.

UPSs are given a power rating in volt-amperes (VA) that range from 300 VA to 5,000 kVA. Most UPS below one kilovolt-ampere (1 kVA) are of the line-interactive or standby variety which are usually less expensive.

For large power units, dynamic uninterruptible power supplies (DUPS) are sometimes used. A synchronous motor/alternator is connected on the mains via a choke. Energy is stored in a flywheel. When the mains power fails, an eddy-current regulation maintains the power on the load as long as the flywheel's energy is not exhausted. DUPS are sometimes combined or integrated with a diesel generator that is turned on after a brief delay, forming a diesel rotary uninterruptible power supply (DRUPS).

=== Offline/standby ===
Offline/standby UPS: The green line illustrates the flow of electric power. Typical protection time: 5–20 minutes. Capacity expansion: Usually not available.

The offline/standby UPS offers only the most basic features, providing surge protection and battery backup. The protected equipment is normally connected directly to incoming utility power. When the incoming voltage falls below or rises above a predetermined level the UPS turns on its internal DC-AC inverter circuitry, which is powered from an internal storage battery. The UPS then mechanically switches the connected equipment onto its DC-AC inverter output. The switch-over time can be as long as 25 milliseconds depending on the amount of time it takes the standby UPS to detect the lost utility voltage. The UPS will be designed to power certain equipment, such as a personal computer, without any objectionable dip or brownout to that device. Since the mid-2020s, hyperscale and AI-oriented data centers have accelerated a shift from valve-regulated lead-acid batteries (VRLA) to lithium iron phosphate (LFP) chemistries in UPS systems, driven by higher energy density, longer cycle life and reduced footprint at the higher rack densities associated with AI accelerators.

=== Line-interactive ===
Line-interactive UPS: The green line illustrates the flow of electric power. Typical protection time: 5–30 minutes. Capacity expansion: several hours.

The line-interactive UPS is similar in operation to a standby UPS but with the addition of a multi-tap variable-voltage autotransformer. This is a special type of transformer that can add or subtract powered coils of wire, thereby increasing or decreasing the magnetic field and the output voltage of the transformer. This may also be performed by a buck–boost transformer which is distinct from an autotransformer, since the former may be wired to provide galvanic isolation.

This type of UPS is able to tolerate continuous undervoltage brownouts and overvoltage surges without consuming the limited reserve battery power. It instead compensates by automatically selecting different power taps on the autotransformer. Depending on the design, changing the autotransformer tap can cause a very brief output power disruption, which may cause UPSs equipped with a power-loss alarm to "chirp" for a moment.

This has become popular even in the cheapest UPSes because it takes advantage of components already included. The main 50/60 Hz transformer used to convert between line voltage and battery voltage needs to provide two slightly different turns ratios: One to convert the battery output voltage (typically a multiple of 12 V) to line voltage, and a second one to convert the line voltage to a slightly higher battery charging voltage (such as a multiple of 14 V). The difference between the two voltages is because charging a battery requires a delta voltage (up to 13–14 V for charging a 12 V battery). Furthermore, it is easier to do the switching on the line-voltage side of the transformer because of the lower currents on that side.

To gain the buck/boost feature, all that is required is two separate switches so that the AC input can be connected to one of the two primary taps, while the load is connected to the other, thus using the main transformer's primary windings as an autotransformer. The battery can still be charged while "bucking" an overvoltage, but while "boosting" an undervoltage, the transformer output is too low to charge the batteries.

Autotransformers can be engineered to cover a wide range of varying input voltages, but this requires more taps and increases complexity, as well as the expense of the UPS. It is common for the autotransformer to cover a range only from about 90 V to 140 V for 120 V power, and then switch to battery if the voltage goes much higher or lower than that range.

In low-voltage conditions the UPS will use more current than normal, so it may need a higher current circuit than a normal device. For example, to power a 1000 W device at 120 V, the UPS will draw 8.33 A. If a brownout occurs and the voltage drops to 100 V, the UPS will draw 10 A to compensate. This also works in reverse, so that in an overvoltage condition, the UPS will need less current.

=== Online/double-conversion ===
In an online UPS, the batteries are always connected to the inverter, so that no power transfer switches are necessary. When power loss occurs, the rectifier simply drops out of the circuit and the batteries keep the power steady and unchanged. When power is restored, the rectifier resumes carrying most of the load and begins charging the batteries, though the charging current may be limited to prevent the high-power rectifier from damaging the batteries. The main advantage of an online UPS is its ability to provide an "electrical firewall" between the incoming utility power and sensitive electronic equipment.

The online UPS is ideal for environments where electrical isolation is necessary or for equipment that is very sensitive to power fluctuations. Although it was at one time reserved for very large installations of 10 kW or more, advances in technology have now permitted it to be available as a common consumer device, supplying 500 W or less. The online UPS may be necessary when the power environment is "noisy", when utility power sags, outages and other anomalies are frequent, when protection of sensitive IT equipment loads is required, or when operation from an extended-run backup generator is necessary.

The basic technology of the online UPS is the same as in a standby or line-interactive UPS. However, it typically costs much more, due to it having a much greater current AC-to-DC battery-charger/rectifier, and with the rectifier and inverter designed to run continuously with improved cooling systems. It is called a double-conversion UPS due to the rectifier directly driving the inverter, even when powered from normal AC current.

Online UPS typically has a static transfer switch (STS) for increasing reliability.

== Other designs ==
=== Hybrid topology/double conversion on demand ===
These hybrid rotary UPS designs do not have official designations, although one name used by UTL is "double conversion on demand". This style of UPS is targeted towards high-efficiency applications while still maintaining the features and protection level offered by double conversion.

A hybrid (double conversion on demand) UPS operates as an off-line/standby UPS when power conditions are within a certain preset window. This allows the UPS to achieve very high efficiency ratings. When the power conditions fluctuate outside of the predefined windows, the UPS switches to online/double-conversion operation. In double-conversion mode the UPS can adjust for voltage variations without having to use battery power, can filter out line noise and control frequency.

=== Ferroresonant ===
Ferroresonant units operate in the same way as a standby UPS unit; however, they are online with the exception that a ferroresonant transformer, is used to filter the output. This transformer is designed to hold energy long enough to cover the time between switching from line power to battery power and effectively eliminates the transfer time. Many ferroresonant UPSs are 82–88% efficient (AC/DC-AC) and offer excellent isolation.

The transformer has three windings, one for ordinary mains power, the second for rectified battery power, and the third for output AC power to the load.

This once was the dominant type of UPS and is limited to around the 150 kVA range. These units are still mainly used in some industrial settings (oil and gas, petrochemical, chemical, utility, and heavy industry markets) due to the robust nature of the UPS. Many ferroresonant UPSs utilizing controlled ferro technology may interact with power-factor-correcting equipment. This will result in fluctuating output voltage of the UPS, but may be corrected by reducing the load levels or adding other linear type loads.

=== DC power ===
A UPS designed for powering DC equipment is very similar to an online UPS, except that it does not need an output inverter. Also, if the UPS's battery voltage is matched with the voltage the device needs, the device's power supply will not be needed either. Since one or more power conversion steps are eliminated, this increases efficiency and run time.

Many systems used in telecommunications use an extra-low voltage "common battery" 48 V DC power, because it has less restrictive safety regulations, such as being installed in conduit and junction boxes. DC has typically been the dominant power source for telecommunications, and AC has typically been the dominant source for computers and servers.

There has been much experimentation with 48 V DC power for computer servers, in the hope of reducing the likelihood of failure and the cost of equipment. However, to supply the same amount of power, the current would be higher than an equivalent 115 V or 230 V circuit; greater current requires larger conductors or more energy lost as heat.

High voltage DC (380 V) is finding use in some data center applications and allows for small power conductors, but is subject to the more complex electrical code rules for safe containment of high voltages.

For lower power devices that run on 5 V, some portable battery banks can work as a UPS.

=== Rotary ===
A rotary UPS uses the inertia of a high-mass spinning flywheel (flywheel energy storage) to provide short-term ride-through in the event of power loss. The flywheel also acts as a buffer against power spikes and sags, since such short-term power events are not able to appreciably affect the rotational speed of the high-mass flywheel. It is also one of the oldest designs, predating vacuum tubes and integrated circuits.

It can be considered to be on line since it spins continuously under normal conditions. However, unlike a battery-based UPS, flywheel-based UPS systems typically provide 10 to 20 seconds of protection before the flywheel has slowed and power output stops. It is traditionally used in conjunction with standby generators, providing backup power only for the brief period of time the engine needs to start running and stabilize its output.

The rotary UPS is generally reserved for applications needing more than 10,000 W of protection, to justify the expense and benefit from the advantages rotary UPS systems bring. A larger flywheel or multiple flywheels operating in parallel will increase the reserve running time or capacity.

Because the flywheels are a mechanical power source, it is not necessary to use an electric motor or generator as an intermediary between it and a diesel engine designed to provide emergency power. By using a transmission gearbox, the rotational inertia of the flywheel can be used to directly start up a diesel engine, and once running, the diesel engine can be used to directly spin the flywheel. Multiple flywheels can likewise be connected in parallel through mechanical countershafts, without the need for separate motors and generators for each flywheel.

They are normally designed to provide very high current output compared to a purely electronic UPS, and are better able to provide inrush current for inductive loads such as motor startup or compressor loads, as well as medical MRI and cath lab equipment. It is also able to tolerate short-circuit conditions up to 17 times larger than an electronic UPS, permitting one device to blow a fuse and fail while other devices still continue to be powered from the rotary UPS.

Its life cycle is usually far greater than a purely electronic UPS, up to 30 years or more. But they do require periodic downtime for mechanical maintenance, such as ball bearing replacement. In larger systems, redundancy of the system ensures the availability of processes during this maintenance. Battery-based designs do not require downtime if the batteries can be hot-swapped, which is usually the case for larger units. Newer rotary units use technologies such as magnetic bearings and air-evacuated enclosures to increase standby efficiency and reduce maintenance to very low levels.

Typically, the high-mass flywheel is used in conjunction with a motor-generator system. These units can be configured as:

1. A motor driving a mechanically connected generator,
2. A combined synchronous motor and generator wound in alternating slots of a single rotor and stator,
3. A hybrid rotary UPS, designed similar to an online UPS, except that it uses the flywheel in place of batteries. The rectifier drives a motor to spin the flywheel, while a generator uses the flywheel to power the inverter.

In case No. 3, the motor generator can be synchronous/synchronous or induction/synchronous. The motor side of the unit in case Nos. 2 and 3 can be driven directly by an AC power source (typically when in inverter bypass), a 6-step double-conversion motor drive, or a 6-pulse inverter. Case No. 1 uses an integrated flywheel as a short-term energy source instead of batteries to allow time for external, electrically coupled gensets to start and be brought online. Case Nos. 2 and 3 can use batteries or a free-standing electrically coupled flywheel as the short-term energy source.

== Form factors ==
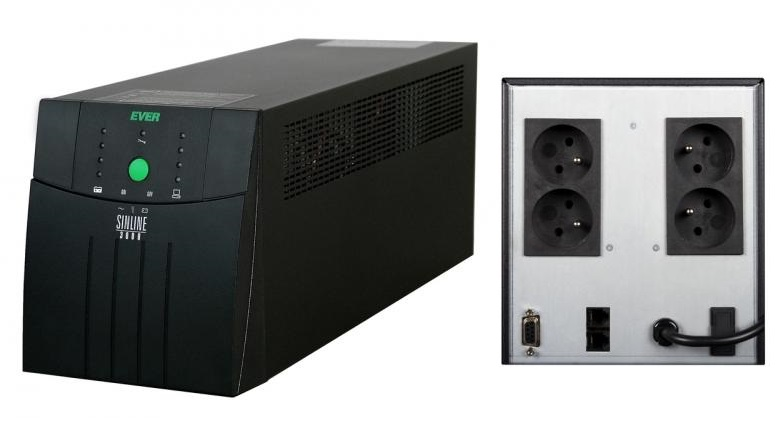
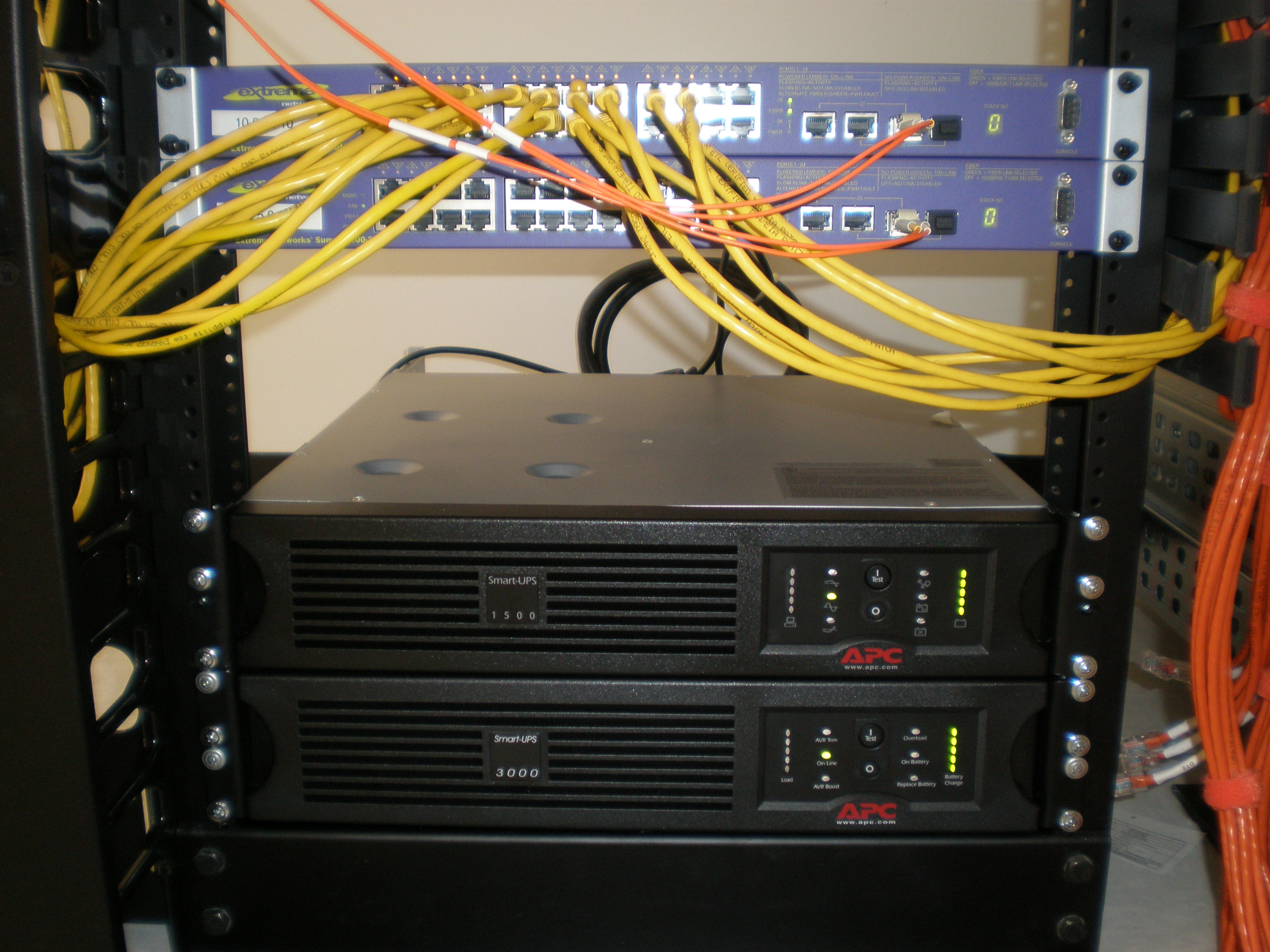
Tower (top) and two rack-mount models

Smaller UPS systems come in several different forms and sizes. However, the two most common forms are tower and rack-mount.

Tower models stand upright on the ground or on a desk or shelf, and are typically used in network workstations or desktop computer applications. Rack-mount models can be mounted in standard 19-inch rack enclosures and can require anywhere from 1U to 12U (rack units). They are typically used in server and networking applications. Some devices feature user interfaces that rotate 90°, allowing the devices to be mounted vertically on the ground or horizontally as would be found in a rack.

== Applications ==
=== N + 1 ===
In large business environments where reliability is of great importance, a single huge UPS can also be a single point of failure that can disrupt many other systems. To provide greater reliability, multiple smaller UPS modules and batteries can be integrated together to provide redundant power protection equivalent to one very large UPS. "N + 1" means that if the load can be supplied by N modules, the installation will contain N + 1 modules. In this way, failure of one module will not impact system operation.

=== Multiple redundancy ===
Many computer servers offer the option of redundant power supplies, so that in the event of one power supply failing, one or more other power supplies are able to power the load. This is a critical point – each power supply must be able to power the entire server by itself.

Redundancy is further enhanced by plugging each power supply into a different circuit (i.e. to a different circuit breaker).

Redundant protection can be extended further yet by connecting each power supply to its own UPS. This provides double protection from both a power supply failure and a UPS failure, so that continued operation is assured. This configuration is also referred to as 1 + 1 or 2N redundancy. If the budget does not allow for two identical UPS units then it is common practice to plug one power supply into mains power and the other into the UPS.

=== Outdoor use ===
When a UPS system is placed outdoors, it should have some specific features that guarantee that it can tolerate weather without any effects on performance. Factors such as temperature, humidity, rain, and snow among others should be considered by the manufacturer when designing an outdoor UPS system. Operating temperature ranges for outdoor UPS systems could be around −40 °C to +55 °C.

Outdoor UPS systems can either be pole, ground (pedestal), or host mounted. Outdoor environment could mean extreme cold, in which case the outdoor UPS system should include a battery heater mat, or extreme heat, in which case the outdoor UPS system should include a fan system or an air conditioning system.

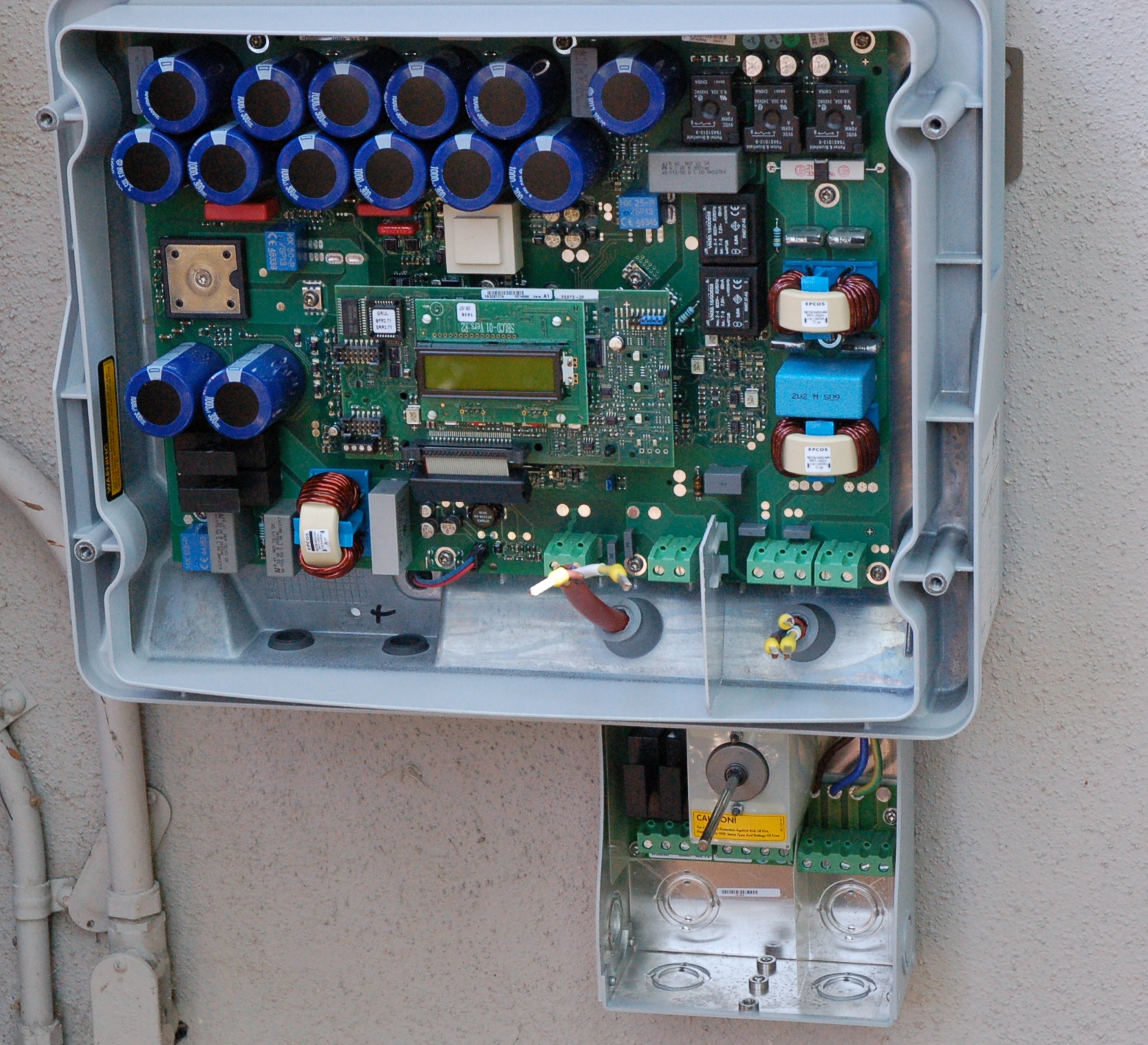
Internal view of a solar inverter. Note the many large capacitors (blue cylinders), used to store energy briefly and improve the output waveform.

A solar inverter, or PV inverter, or solar converter, converts the variable direct current (DC) output of a photovoltaic (PV) solar panel into a utility frequency alternating current (AC) that can be fed into a commercial electrical grid or used by a local, off-grid electrical network. It is a critical BOS–component in a photovoltaic system, allowing the use of ordinary AC-powered equipment. Solar inverters have special functions adapted for use with photovoltaic arrays, including maximum power point tracking and anti-islanding protection.

== Harmonic distortion ==
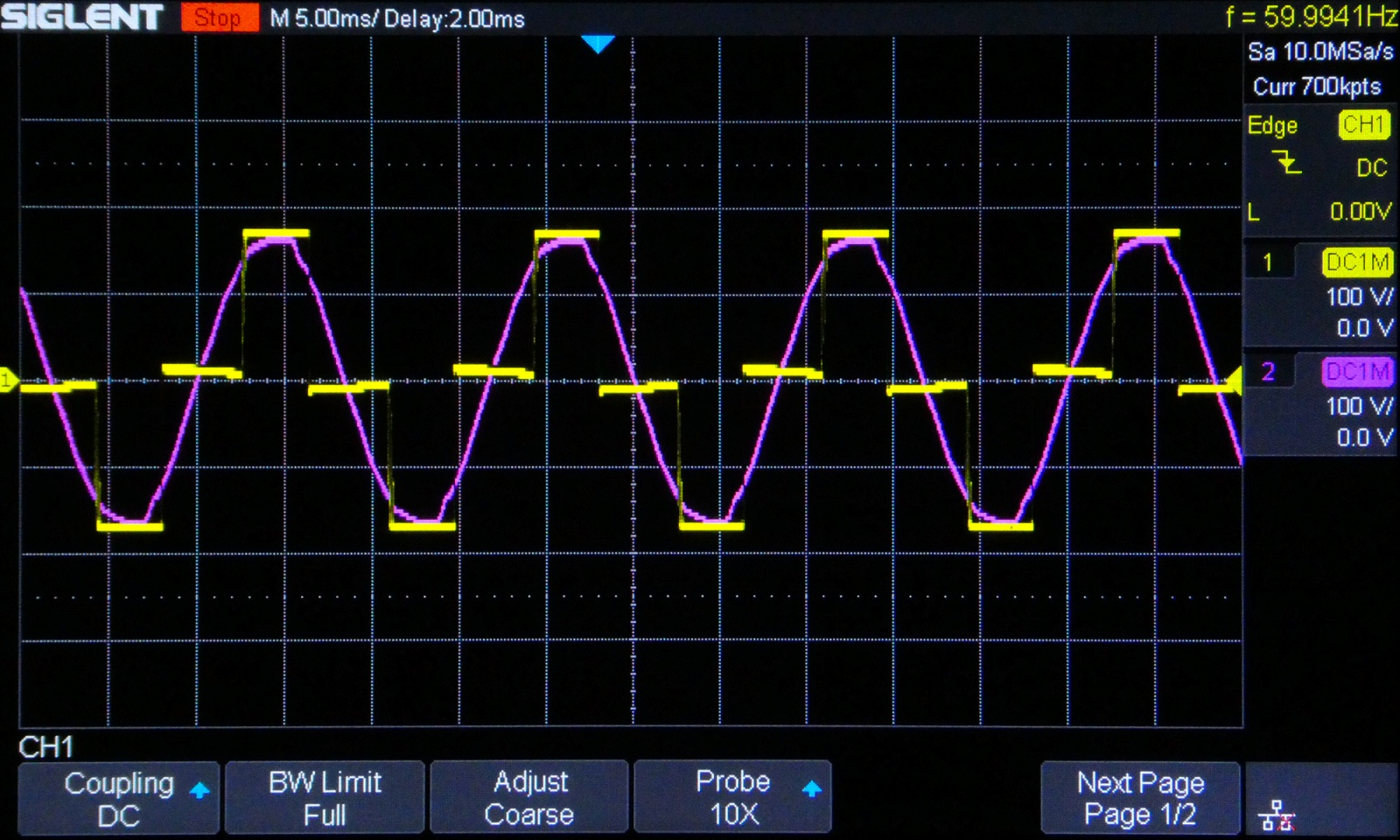
UPS output waveform (yellow) compared to normal 120 VAC 60 Hz power waveform (violet)

The output of some electronic UPSes can have a significant departure from an ideal sinusoidal waveform. This is especially true of inexpensive consumer-grade single-phase units designed for home and office use. These often utilize simple switching AC power supplies and the output resembles a square wave rich in harmonics. These harmonics can cause interference with other electronic devices including radio communication, and some devices (e.g. inductive loads such as AC motors) may perform with reduced efficiency or not at all. More sophisticated (and expensive) UPS units can produce nearly pure sinusoidal AC power.

== Power factor ==
A problem in the combination of a double-conversion UPS and a generator is the voltage distortion created by the UPS. The input of a double-conversion UPS is essentially a big rectifier. The current drawn by the UPS is non-sinusoidal. This can cause the voltage from the AC mains or a generator to also become non-sinusoidal. The voltage distortion then can cause problems in all electrical equipment connected to that power source, including the UPS itself. It will also cause more power to be lost in the wiring supplying power to the UPS due to the spikes in current flow. This level of "noise" is measured as a percentage of "total harmonic distortion of the current" (THD_{I}). Classic UPS rectifiers have a THD_{I} level of around 25%–30%. To reduce voltage distortion, this requires heavier mains wiring or generators more than twice as large as the UPS.

There are several solutions to reduce the THD_{I} in a double-conversion UPS:

Classic solutions such as passive filters reduce THD_{I} to 5%–10% at full load. They are reliable, but big and only work at full load, and present their own problems when used in tandem with generators.

An alternative solution is an active filter. Through the use of such a device, THD_{I} can drop to 5% over the full power range. The newest technology in double-conversion UPS units is a rectifier that does not use classic rectifier components (thyristors and diodes) but uses high-frequency components instead. A double-conversion UPS with an insulated-gate bipolar transistor rectifier and inductor can have a THD_{I} as small as 2%. This eliminates the need to oversize the generator (and transformers), without additional filters, investment cost, losses, or space.

== Communication ==
Power management (PM) requires:

1. The UPS to report its status to the computer it powers via a communications link such as a serial port, Ethernet and Simple Network Management Protocol, GSM/GPRS or USB
2. A subsystem in the OS that processes the reports and generates notifications, PM events, or commands an ordered shut down. Some UPS manufacturers publish their communication protocols, but other manufacturers (such as APC) use proprietary protocols.

The basic computer-to-UPS control methods are intended for one-to-one signaling from a single source to a single target. For example, a single UPS may connect to a single computer to provide status information about the UPS, and allow the computer to control the UPS. Similarly, the USB protocol is also intended to connect a single computer to multiple peripheral devices.

In some situations, it is useful for a single large UPS to be able to communicate with several protected devices. For traditional serial or USB control, a signal replication device may be used, which for example allows one UPS to connect to five computers using serial or USB connections. However, the splitting is typically only one direction from UPS to the devices to provide status information. Return control signals may only be permitted from one of the protected systems to the UPS.

As Ethernet has increased in common use since the 1990s, control signals are now commonly sent between a single UPS and multiple computers using standard Ethernet data communication methods such as TCP/IP. The status and control information is typically encrypted so that, for example, an outside hacker can not gain control of the UPS and command it to shut down.

Distribution of UPS status and control data requires that all intermediary devices such as Ethernet switches or serial multiplexers be powered by one or more UPS systems, in order for the UPS alerts to reach the target systems during a power outage. To avoid the dependency on Ethernet infrastructure, the UPSs can be connected directly to the main control server by using a GSM/GPRS channel also. The SMS or GPRS data packets sent from UPSs trigger software to shut down the PCs to reduce the load.

== Batteries ==
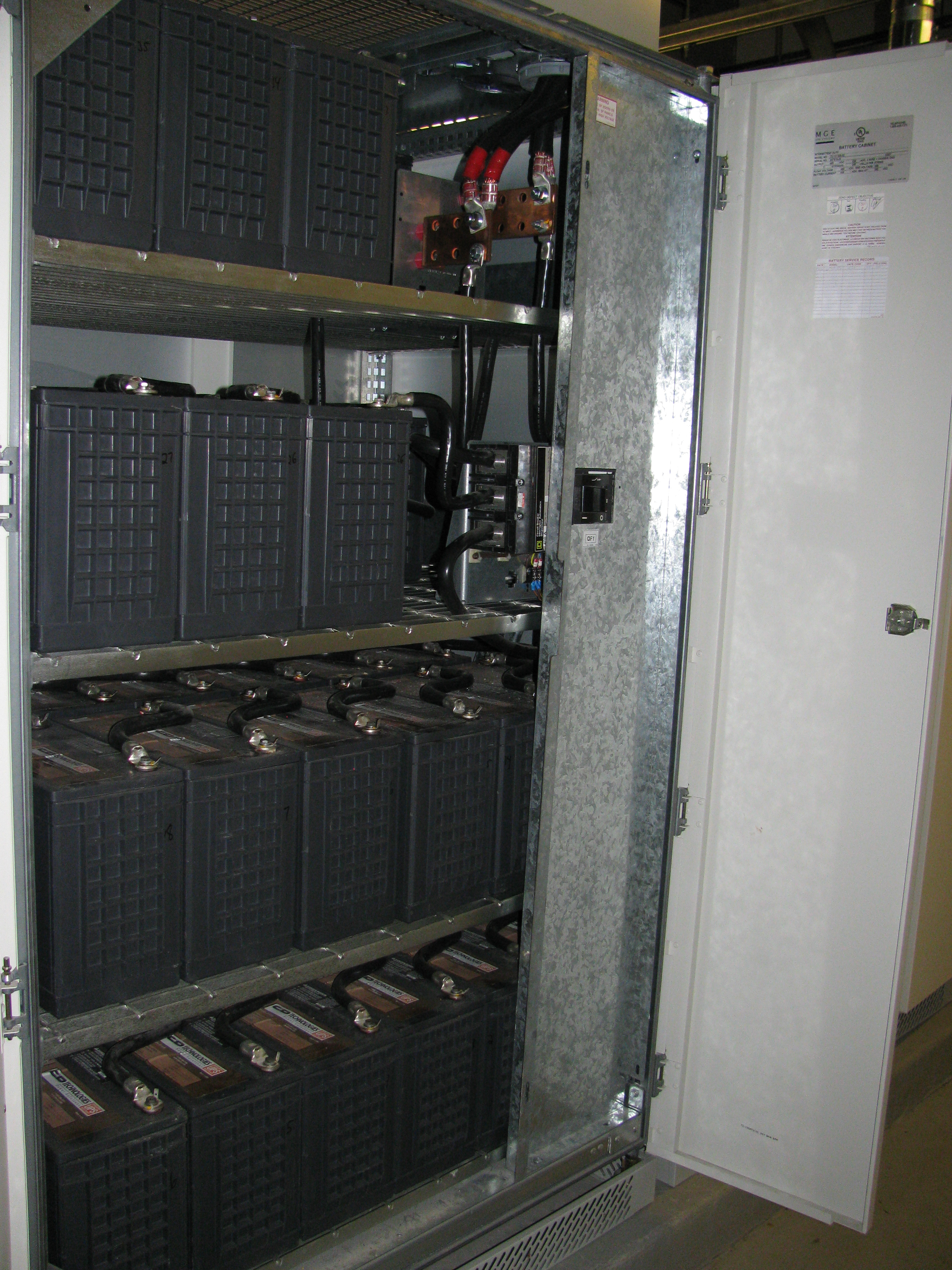
Battery cabinet

There are three main types of UPS batteries: valve-regulated lead–acid (VRLA), flooded cell or VLA batteries, and lithium-ion batteries. The run-time for a battery-operated UPS depends on the type and size of batteries and rate of discharge, and the efficiency of the inverter. The total capacity of a lead–acid battery is a function of the rate at which it is discharged, which is described as Peukert's law.

Manufacturers supply run-time rating in minutes for packaged UPS systems. Larger systems (such as for data centers) require detailed calculation of the load, inverter efficiency, and battery characteristics to ensure the required endurance is attained.

=== Common battery characteristics and load testing ===
When a lead–acid battery is charged or discharged, this initially affects only the reacting chemicals, which are at the interface between the electrodes and the electrolyte. With time, the charge stored in the chemicals at the interface, often called "interface charge", spreads by diffusion of these chemicals throughout the volume of the active material.

If a battery has been completely discharged (e.g. the car lights were left on overnight) and next is given a fast charge for only a few minutes, then during the short charging time it develops only a charge near the interface. The battery voltage may rise to be close to the charger voltage so that the charging current decreases significantly. After a few hours, this interface charge will not spread to the volume of the electrode and electrolyte, leading to an interface charge so low that it may be insufficient to start a car.

Due to the interface charge, brief UPS self-test functions lasting only a few seconds may not accurately reflect the true runtime capacity of a UPS, and instead an extended recalibration or rundown test that deeply discharges the battery is needed.

The deep discharge testing is itself damaging to batteries due to the chemicals in the discharged battery starting to crystallize into highly stable molecular shapes that will not re-dissolve when the battery is recharged, permanently reducing charge capacity. In lead–acid batteries, this is known as sulfation, but deep-discharge damage also affects other types such as nickel-cadmium batteries and lithium batteries. Therefore, it is commonly recommended that rundown tests be performed infrequently, such as every six months to a year.

=== Testing of strings of batteries/cells ===
Multi-kilowatt commercial UPS systems with large and easily accessible battery banks are capable of isolating and testing individual cells within a battery string, which consists of either combined-cell battery units (such as 12 V lead acid batteries) or individual chemical cells wired in series. Isolating a single cell and installing a jumper in place of it allows the one battery to be discharge-tested, while the rest of the battery string remains charged and available to provide protection.

It is also possible to measure the electrical characteristics of individual cells in a battery string, using intermediate sensor wires that are installed at every cell-to-cell junction, and monitored both individually and collectively. Battery strings may also be wired as series-parallel, for example, two sets of 20 cells. In such a situation it is also necessary to monitor current flow between parallel strings, as current may circulate between the strings to balance out the effects of weak cells, dead cells with high resistance, or shorted cells. For example, stronger strings can discharge through weaker strings until voltage imbalances are equalized, and this must be factored into the individual inter-cell measurements within each string.

=== Series–parallel battery interactions ===
Battery strings wired in series–parallel can develop unusual failure modes due to interactions between the multiple parallel strings. Defective batteries in one string can adversely affect the operation and lifespan of good or new batteries in other strings. These issues also apply to other situations where series-parallel strings are used, not just in UPS systems but also in electric vehicle applications.

Consider a series-parallel battery arrangement with all good cells, and one becomes shorted or dead:

- The failed cell will reduce the maximum developed voltage for the entire series string it is within.
- Other series strings wired in parallel with the degraded string will now discharge through the degraded string until their voltage matches the voltage of the degraded string, potentially overcharging and leading to electrolyte boiling and outgassing from the remaining good cells in the degraded string. These parallel strings can now never be fully recharged, as the increased voltage will bleed off through the string containing the failed battery.
- Charging systems may attempt to gauge battery string capacity by measuring overall voltage. Due to the overall string voltage depletion due to the dead cells, the charging system may detect this as a state of discharge, and will continuously attempt to charge the series-parallel strings, which leads to continuous overcharging and damage to all the cells in the degraded series string containing the damaged battery.
- If lead–acid batteries are used, all cells in the formerly good parallel strings will begin to sulfate due to the inability for them to be fully recharged, resulting in the storage capacity of these cells being permanently damaged, even if the damaged cell in the one degraded string is eventually discovered and replaced with a new one.

The only way to prevent these subtle series-parallel string interactions is by not using parallel strings at all and using separate charge controllers and inverters for individual series strings.

=== Series new/old battery interactions ===
Even just a single string of batteries wired in series can have adverse interactions if new batteries are mixed with old batteries. Older batteries tend to have reduced storage capacity, and so will both discharge faster than new batteries and also charge to their maximum capacity more rapidly than new batteries.

As a mixed string of new and old batteries is depleted, the string voltage will drop, and when the old batteries are exhausted the new batteries still have charge available. The newer cells may continue to discharge through the rest of the string, but due to the low voltage this energy flow may not be useful and may be wasted in the old cells as resistance heating.

For cells that are supposed to operate within a specific discharge window, new cells with more capacity may cause the old cells in the series string to continue to discharge beyond the safe bottom limit of the discharge window, damaging the old cells.

When recharged, the old cells recharge more rapidly, leading to a rapid rise of voltage to near the fully charged state, but before the new cells with more capacity have fully recharged. The charge controller detects the high voltage of a nearly fully charged string and reduces current flow. The new cells with more capacity now charge very slowly, so slowly that the chemicals may begin to crystallize before reaching the fully charged state, reducing new cell capacity over several charge/discharge cycles until their capacity more closely matches the old cells in the series string.

For such reasons, some industrial UPS management systems recommend periodic replacement of entire battery arrays potentially using hundreds of expensive batteries, due to these damaging interactions between new batteries and old batteries, within and across series and parallel strings.

== Standards ==
- IEC 62040-1:2017 Uninterruptible power systems (UPS) – Part 1: General and safety requirements for UPS
- IEC 62040-2:2016 Uninterruptible power systems (UPS) – Part 2: Electromagnetic compatibility (EMC) requirements
- IEC 62040-3:2021 Uninterruptible power systems (UPS) – Part 3: Method of specifying the performance and test requirements
- IEC 62040-4:2013 Uninterruptible power systems (UPS) – Part 4: Environmental aspects – Requirements and reporting

== See also ==
- Battery room
- Emergency power system
- Fuel cell applications
- IT baseline protection
- Power conditioner
- Dynamic voltage restoration
- Net metering system with energy storage
- Surge protector
- Switched-mode power supply (SMPS)
- Switched-mode power supply applications
- Emergency light
