= Point of common coupling =

Connection to a power grid

In electric power distribution the point of common coupling (PCC) is where a consumer's electrical circuit connects to the utility grid. It serves as a demarcation point, defining the boundary between the public utility network and the customer's private electrical installation. The term has different meanings in electrical standards and guidelines, depending on the context. At the PCC the utility's responsibility for power delivery ends and the consumer's responsibility for their internal power quality begins. The PCC is typically located at the electrical meter, the service transformer secondary terminals, or the main service entrance. The conditions and characteristics of the electrical supply, such as voltage, frequency, and power quality, are measured and monitored at this point to ensure compliance with grid codes and regulatory standards.

In the context of Distributed Energy Resources (DERs) and microgrids, the PCC takes on added significance. It is the point where locally generated power—from sources such as solar panels, wind turbines, or combined heat and power (CHP) systems—may be injected into the grid. The behavior of these systems, including their power sharing capabilities in both grid-connected and islanded modes, is evaluated at the PCC. The design and operation of DERs must ensure that their interconnection does not negatively impact the grid's stability or power quality. The PCC also plays a vital role in the protection and safety of the electrical network, as it is the location where protection devices are installed to isolate the customer's system from the grid during faults or other abnormal conditions.

Power quality issues, such as harmonic distortion, voltage sags, and voltage swells, are frequently analyzed at the PCC. These issues can arise from either the utility side or the customer side and can have detrimental effects on sensitive equipment and overall system reliability. For this reason, standards such as IEEE 519 and others provide guidelines for the limits of harmonic current and voltage distortion at the PCC. Adhering to these standards is essential for maintaining a reliable and stable electrical grid. The PCC is thus both a physical connection point and a critical interface for ensuring the safe, stable, and high-quality transfer of electrical power between a consumer and the main grid.

== Definitions ==
IEEE Std 1547-2018 defines the PCC as the connection between an area electric power system (Area EPS) and a local electric power system (Local EPS). A Local EPS is confined to a single premises or group of premises, while an Area EPS serves Local EPSs. The PCC usually corresponds to the service point defined in the National Electrical Code and the National Electrical Safety Code.

IEEE 1547 declares the differnce between the PCC and the point of DER connection (PoC): at the latter an individual distributed energy resource attaches to the Local EPS and has to support the requirements of the standard. It also defines a reference point of applicability (RPA), where the performance requirements apply. This is generally the PCC, although under specified conditions it can be the PoC or a point between them.

IEEE Std 519-2022 deals with harmonic distortions and defines the PCC as the point on the public supply network closest upstream to a particular load where there is a (real or potential) connection to other loads. In case of an industrial customer supplied through a dedicated service transformer, the PCC is usually on the transformer's high-voltage side. For commercial customers sharing a service transformer, it is commonly on the low-voltage side. The standard's harmonic limits apply at the PCC to the installation as a whole; they do not apply to individual equipment or to points within the customer's installation.

IEEE Std 2030.7-2017 specifies the functions of microgrid controllers and uses the term point of interconnection (POI) instead of point of common coupling exacly due to the different meanings of POC across standards and guidelines. It defines the POI as the electrical connection through which a microgrid connects to or disconnects from the main distribution grid. For the purposes of the standard, the microgrid interacts with the external grid through one controlled point, even if several physical connections exist.

== See also ==
- Active power filter
