= Active power filter =

Device to perform harmonic elimination

Active power filters (APF) are filters, which can perform the job of harmonic elimination. Active power filters can be used to filter out harmonics in the power system which are significantly below the switching frequency of the filter. The active power filters are used to filter out both higher and lower order harmonics in the power system. An Active Power Filter is a power electronics device used to address power quality issues, such as low power factor, as well as voltage and current harmonics, which are caused by the increasing use of nonlinear loads in electrical systems. The use of APFs has become more common in recent years due to improvements in power electronics technology, replacing older passive filters that often had issues with large size and resonance.

The main difference between active power filters and passive power filters is that APFs mitigate harmonics by injecting active power with the same frequency but with reverse phase to cancel that harmonic, where passive power filters use combinations of resistors (R), inductors (L) and capacitors (C) and does not require an external power source or active components such as transistors. This difference, make it possible for APFs to mitigate a wide range of harmonics.

Active Power Filters (APFs) and passive filters are both used to address power quality issues, but they differ significantly in their operation and capabilities. Passive filters, while conventionally used to maintain harmonics under a sensible level, have several problems, such as a large size and resonance issues. They consist of passive components like resistors, inductors, and capacitors tuned to a specific frequency to eliminate a particular harmonic. This makes them less flexible and effective in environments where harmonic content changes.

In contrast, APFs are dynamic and more adaptable. They use power electronics to inject a compensating current into the system that is equal in magnitude but opposite in phase to the harmonic currents, thereby canceling them out. This active approach allows APFs to effectively mitigate harmonics, compensate for reactive power, and balance three-phase currents. Due to improvements in power electronics, APFs have largely replaced passive filters, especially in complex and dynamic systems. While passive filters might be a simpler and cheaper solution for fixed, single-harmonic problems, APFs offer a more comprehensive and flexible solution for modern power grids with varying loads and conditions. They are capable of responding to different harmonic frequencies and dynamic changes in the network, a task that is difficult or impossible for passive filters.

== Common applications ==
shunt active power filter, which is connected in parallel with the electrical system at the point of common coupling (PCC). Its main function is to mitigate load current harmonics supplied by the power supply. Shunt APFs can also compensate for reactive power and balance three-phase currents. They draw a limited current from the network to compensate for their own losses and to provide the necessary harmonic compensation current. For systems that require higher current compensation, multiple shunt APFs can be connected in parallel.

A variety of control strategies have been proposed for shunt APFs, including hysteresis control, deadbeat control, and proportional-integral (PI) control. Another common basis for three-phase APF control is instantaneous active and reactive power theory, also called p-q theory, introduced by Hirofumi Akagi, Yoshihira Kanazawa, and Akira Nabae in work on switching-device compensators. However, many of these conventional methods have limitations. For example, hysteresis control can lead to high switching stress and power losses due to its changing switching frequency, while PI and deadbeat controllers can be inaccurate in complex harmonic conditions or sensitive to inaccurate parameters, respectively. As a result, researchers have been exploring alternative methods, such as those that use artificial neural networks (ANNs), which can control a system without needing a precise mathematical model. The mimetic neural network approach is one such strategy, where an ANN learns to mimic the behavior of a classic controller, and once trained, the classic controller can be removed.

== Key Advantages ==
- Harmonic Compensation: APFs effectively mitigate current harmonics, which are a major problem caused by the increasing use of nonlinear loads. This helps to improve the overall quality of power in the grid.
- Reactive Power and Current Balancing: Shunt APFs can be used to compensate for reactive power and to balance three-phase currents. This helps to ensure a more stable and efficient power supply.
- Versatility: APFs can be connected in parallel to provide higher compensation currents, making them suitable for a wide range of power applications.
- Adaptability: Unlike traditional passive filters, APFs can adapt to changing conditions and dynamics within the system, especially when using advanced control methods like neural networks. This allows them to effectively address problems even when the system's behavior is unknown.

== See also ==
- Static synchronous series compensator
- Power conditioner
- Active filter
- Line filter
