= Rapid voltage change =

A rapid voltage change (RVC) is one of the power-quality (PQ) issue related to voltage disturbance. "According to IEC 61000-4-30, Ed. 3 standard, RVC is defined as "a quick transition in root means square (r.m.s.) voltage occurring between two steady-state conditions, and during which the r.m.s. voltage does not exceed the dip/swell thresholds." Switching processes such as motor starting, capacitor bank on/off, load switching, or transformer tap-changer operations can all create RVCs. Moreover, they can also be induced by sudden load variations or by disturbance in power output from distributed energy sources such as solar or wind power system. The main known effect of rapid voltage changes is light flicker, but other non-flicker effects also have been reported.

== Rapid voltage change effect ==
The RVC voltage disturbance level is not as big as sag / dip and swell. While RVC events generally are not destructive for electronic equipment, it can be annoying for final users as they may influence light flicker.
