= Diesel rotary uninterruptible power supply =

Type of power supply

Most forms of uninterruptible power supply (UPS) can be powered by either battery or flywheel energy. These are ready for immediate use at the instant that the mains electricity fails, but the relatively small and finite amount of stored energy they contain makes them suitable for short periods of use, typically in the order of a few dozen minutes to a couple of hours depending on the actual load. To get uninterruptible and continuous power supply, a diesel-generator back-up system is needed along with a fuel supply plan that includes on-demand replacement.

Diesel rotary uninterruptible power supply devices (DRUPS) combine the functionality of a battery- or flywheel-powered UPS and a diesel generator. When mains electricity supply is within specification, an electrical motor/generator with a flywheel functions as a motor to store kinetic energy. When mains electricity supply fails, stored energy in the flywheel is released to drive the motor/generator, which continues to supply power without interruption. At the same time (or with some delay, for example 2 to 11 seconds, to prevent the diesel engine from starting at every incident), the diesel engine takes over from the flywheel to drive the electrical generator to make the electricity required. The electro-magnetic flywheel can continue to support the diesel generator in order to keep a stable output frequency. Typically a DRUPS will have enough fuel to power the load for days or even weeks in the event of failure of the mains electricity supply.

The main advantages of DRUPS equipment compared to a battery-powered UPS combined with a diesel generator are the higher overall system energy efficiency, smaller footprint, use of fewer components, longer technical lifetime (no use of power electronics) and the fact it does not result in chemical waste (no use of batteries).

The main disadvantages of DRUPS equipment are a more frequent maintenance regimen due to the number of moving parts. DRUPS are also typically installed in external buildings due to noise concerns from the generators.

A DRUPS can provide a ride-through time of 15–40 seconds. A flywheel UPS can be installed ahead of typical UPS battery systems to reduce the effects of lightning & switching transients and to increase battery life.

== See also ==
- Spot network substation
