= Bradford Roberts =

Electrical engineer

Bradford Roberts is an electrical engineer from S&C Electric Company in Franklin, Wisconsin. He was named a Fellow of the Institute of Electrical and Electronics Engineers (IEEE) in 2014 for his contributions to the uninterruptible power supply industry and battery.
