= Deadbeat =

Deadbeat, deadbeats or dead-beat may refer to:

== Literature ==
- Dead Beat (novel), a 2005 book of the Dresden Files series by Jim Butcher
- Dead Beat, a 1992 novel by Val McDermid

== Film and television ==
- Deadbeat (TV series), a 2014 Hulu original TV series
- "Deadbeat" (Cold Squad), a 2004 television episode
- Deadbeats, a 1977 film, starring Chris Mulkey
- Dead Beat, a 1994 film based on the life of real-life serial killer Charles Schmid

== Music ==
- Deadbeat (musician), Canadian electronica musician
- Deadbeat (album), by Tame Impala, 2025
- Deadbeat!, a 2024 album by American musician Jack Kays
- Deadbeats, a record label launched by Canadian electronic music duo Zeds Dead
- Dead Beats, a 2020 EP by VTuber Mori Calliope
- "Dead-Beat", a song by King Gizzard & the Lizard Wizard from the 2011 EP Willoughby's Beach

== Other uses ==
- Deadbeat escapement, a type of escapement used in pendulum clocks
- Dead-beat control, a problem in discrete control theory of finding an optimal input sequence that will bring the system output to a given setpoint in a finite number of time steps
- Deadbeat parent, pejorative term referring to parents who do not fulfill their parental responsibilities

== See also ==
- "Deadbeat Club", a song by the B-52's from their 1989 album Cosmic Thing
- Uncle Acid & the Deadbeats, an English rock band formed in 2009
