= Dynamic voltage restoration =

Dynamic voltage restoration (DVR) is a method of overcoming voltage sags and swells that occur in electrical power distribution. These are a problem because spikes consume power and sags reduce efficiency of some devices. DVR saves energy through voltage injections that can affect the phase and wave-shape of the power being supplied.

Devices used for DVR include static VAR devices, which are series compensation devices that use voltage source converters (VSC). The first such system in North America was installed in 1996 – a 12.47 kV system located in Anderson, South Carolina.

== Operation ==
The basic principle of dynamic voltage restoration is to inject a voltage of the magnitude and frequency necessary to restore the load side voltage to the desired amplitude and waveform, even when the source voltage is unbalanced or distorted. Generally, devices for dynamic voltage restoration employ gate turn off thyristors, (GTO) solid state power electronic switches in a pulse-width modulated (PWM) inverter structure. The DVR can generate or absorb independently controllable real and reactive power at the load side. In other words, the DVR is a solid state DC to AC switching power converter that injects a set of three-phase AC output voltages in series and synchronicity with the distribution and transmission line voltages.

The source of the injected voltage is the commutation process for reactive power demand and an energy source for the real power demand. The energy source may vary according to the design and manufacturer of the DVR, but DC capacitors and batteries drawn from the line through a rectifier are frequently used. The energy source is typically connected to the DVR through its DC input terminal.

The amplitude and phase angle of the injected voltages are variable, thereby allowing control of the real and reactive power exchange between the dynamic voltage restorer and the distribution system. As the reactive power exchange between the DVR and the distribution system is internally generated by the DVR without the AC passive reactive components.

== Similar devices ==
DVRs use a technically an approach similar to that of low-voltage ride-through (LVRT) systems used in wind turbine generators. The dynamic response characteristics, particularly for line-supplied DVRs, are similar to those in LVRT-mitigated turbines. Conduction losses in both kinds of devices are often minimized by using integrated gate-commutated thyristor (IGCT) technology in the inverters.

== Applications ==
Practically, DVR systems can to inject up to 50% of nominal voltage, but only for a short time (up to 0.1 seconds). However, most voltage sags are much less than 50 percent, so this is not typically an issue.

DVRs can also mitigate the damaging effects of voltage swells, voltage unbalance and other waveform distortions.

== Drawbacks ==
DVRs may provide good solutions for end-users subject to unwanted power quality disturbances. However, they are generally not used in systems that are subject to prolonged reactive power deficiencies (resulting in low voltage conditions) and in systems that are vulnerable to voltage collapse. Because DVRs will maintain appropriate supply voltage, in such systems where incipient voltage conditions are present they actually make collapses more difficult to prevent and can even lead to cascading interruptions.

Therefore, when applying DVRs, it is vital to consider the nature of the load whose voltage supply is being secured, as well as the transmission system which must tolerate the change in voltage-response of the load. It may be necessary to provide local fast reactive supply sources in order to protect the system, including the DVR, from voltage collapse and cascading interruptions.

== SSSC and DVR ==
The static synchronous series compensator’s counterpart is the dynamic voltage regulator (DVR). Although both are utilized for series voltage sag compensation, their operating principles differ from each other. The static synchronous series compensator injects a balance voltage in series with the transmission line. On the other hand, the DVR compensates the unbalance in supply voltage of different phases. Also, DVRs are usually installed on a critical feeder supplying the active power through DC energy storage and the required reactive power is generated internally without any means of DC storage.

== See also ==
- Electric power quality
- Voltage sag
- Static synchronous series compensator (SSSC)
