= Jack Kays =

American singer-songwriter (born 1998)

- Born: December 15, 1998 (age 27); Ohio, U.S.
- Origin: Cincinnati, Ohio
- Genres: Indie rock; hip-hop; pop-punk; emo
- Years active: 2013–present
- Label: None
- Website: www.jackkays.com

Jack Kays (born December 15, 1998) is an American musician and singer-songwriter from Cincinnati, Ohio.

== Early life and education ==
Jack grew up in Cincinnati, Ohio, and participated in theater and band in high school. He graduated from Sycamore High School.

== Career ==
After graduating, he struggled with drug addiction and started off his career posting Soundcloud rap.

In May 2020, Kays released his breakthrough song, "Morbid Mind". After gaining traction, he was signed to Columbia Records. In 2021, he released a studio album, Mixed Emotions, and EPs voice memos and My Favorite Nightmares, the latter in collaboration with Blink-182 drummer Travis Barker.

From February to May 2025, Jack Kays went on his headlining Washed Up Dried Out World Tour, promoting his album Deadbeat!, with performances across Australia, North America, Europe, and the United Kingdom.

== Personal life ==
He can play ten instruments and is a culinary chef. In 2021, he moved to Washington, D.C. and lives with his wife Cagla Akcadag. Jack's real name is John, he said in an interview, but he always felt that he was a Jack more than a John. His brother's name is Austin and is the bassist for his band.

== Discography ==
=== Albums ===
- Mixed Emotions (2021)
- Deadbeat! - Disc 1 (2024)
- Deadbeat! - Disc 2 (2024)
- Call it what you want (2026)

=== Extended plays ===
- voice memos (2021)
- My Favorite Nightmares with Travis Barker (2021)
- Cessation (2022)
- Caffeine (2023)

=== Singles ===
- "MY HEAD :(" (2021)
- "Middle of the End (How Does It Feel)" (2021)
- "Outrun Myself" with Travis Barker (2021)
- "Feel Like Me" (2023)
- "Blow it" (2024)
- "GET A JOB!" (2024)
- "Deadbeat!" (2024)
- "To Be American" (2026)
- "I've Got a Gun"(2026)
- "Mirror" (2026)
