= SSSC =

SSSC may refer to:

- Street Sweeper Social Club, American rap rock supergroup
- Superior shoulder suspensory complex, anatomical term
- Scottish Social Services Council
- Static synchronous series compensator, a type of Flexible AC transmission system
- Supreme State Security Court in the Judiciary of Syria
