= Comtrade =

File format

COMTRADE (Common format for Transient Data Exchange for power systems) is a file format for storing oscillography and status data related to transient power system disturbances.

== Applications ==
COMTRADE files are typically generated by Intelligent Electronic Devices (IEDs), such as an electronic protective relay, in electrical substations during power systems disturbances. These IEDs monitor the electrical characteristics of the power system by digitally sampling measurements of the current, voltage, power, frequency, etc. at a high speed.

The IEDs then use digital signal processing algorithms on that data to detect abnormal conditions in the power system so that automated control actions can be taken to prevent damage to the power system. When faults are detected, the IEDs records the data that was used during processing into a COMTRADE file. Analysis tools can then process the COMTRADE file and calculate useful information related to the disturbance.

For instance, a COMTRADE recording of the fault current absorbed by a transformer prior to the circuit breaker opening can be used to calculate the total energy dissipated by the transformer. That helps the utility to more accurately estimate the impact of that fault on the lifetime of the transformer.

COMTRADE files from multiple devices can be used collectively to analyze large-scale power disturbance events (e.g. blackouts) to determine the root cause, improve system protection, and guide mitigation strategies.

== Formats ==
The COMTRADE file format was standardized by the Power System Relaying & Controls Committee (PSRC) of the IEEE Power & Energy Society as C37.111. The original specification was published in 1991. The 1991 version specifies a file format that includes multiple file types designated by the assigned file extensions of *.CFG, *.HDR, and *.DAT. The .DAT file contains the digitized sample data in an ASCII text format. The .CFG file specifies what is in the .DAT file including information such as signal names, start time of the samples, number of samples, min/max values, and more. Only the .CFG and .DAT files were mandatory.

Although the values of the digitized samples in the .DAT file are viewable without the .CFG file, the value of the data is greatly diminished as it would then be difficult to fully analyze the data.

The most widely used version of the COMTRADE standard is C37.111-1999. The 1999 version added a 16-bit Binary .DAT file format and a .INF file. The .CFG file format was augmented to provide details of instrument transformers, allowing conversion between primary and secondary units.

The most recent version is C37.111-2013. The 2013 format added 32-bit Binary and IEEE 754 floating point .DAT formats as well as time zone information. A new, single-file format with extension .CFF was also introduced to combine C37.111-1999 files into a single file. Also known as IEC 60255-24 Ed.2, this standard defines a format for files containing transient waveform and event data collected from power systems or power system models. The standard is for files stored on currently used physical media such as portable external hard drives, USB drives, CD, or DVD.

The file format called Power Quality Data Interchange Format (PQDIF) is similar to COMTRADE in structure but is used primarily to convey power quality data instead of transient disturbance data. Like IEEE COMTRADE, IEEE PQDIF can be used to exchange waveform measurements and phasor measurements. However, IEEE PQDIF allows the storage of data logs, magnitude-duration measurements, histograms, and more. The IEEE Power Quality Subcommittee of the IEEE Power & Energy Society specified the format in IEEE Std.1159.3-2019.

== History ==
As applications for using COMTRADE grew the limitations of the file format began to cause problems. For instance, the North American SynchroPhasor Initiative (NASPI) sponsored by the North American Electric Reliability Corporation wanted to use COMTRADE files to exchange archives of streaming synchrophasor data (IEEE C37.118). The C37.111-1999 version of the COMTRADE configuration (.CFG) files did not include information describing time zones nor timing precision required for synchrophasor data. This would have complicated large-scale exchange of synchrophasor data.

Beginning in 2011, the IEEE PSRC began work on a new version of the COMTRADE standard published as C37.111-2013. The COMTRADE standard itself does not specify how to transfer data files over communication networks.

== Software ==
COMTRADE viewers and analysis software are available from many commercial companies. Viewer/analysis functionality varies. Free COMTRADE viewers and analysis software include advanced functionality e.g. protection relay behavior analysis, line/transformer differential/impedance protection, fault/harmonic analysis, user-defined mathematical expressions, analysis and plots, COMTRADE file editing and creation, etc..

== See also ==
- List of file formats
