= Power conditioner =

Electrical power device

A power conditioner (also known as a line conditioner or power line conditioner) is a device intended to improve the quality of the power that is delivered to electrical load equipment. The term most often refers to a device that acts in one or more ways to deliver a voltage of the proper level and characteristics to enable load equipment to function properly. In some uses, power conditioner refers to a voltage regulator with at least one other function to improve power quality (e.g. power factor correction, noise suppression, transient impulse protection, etc.)

Conditioners specifically work to smooth the sinusoidal A.C. wave form and maintain a constant voltage over varying loads.

== Types ==
An AC power conditioner is the typical power conditioner that provides "clean" AC power to sensitive electrical equipment. Usually this is used for home or office applications and commonly provides surge protection as well as noise filtering.

Power line conditioners take in power and modify it based on the requirements of the machinery to which they are connected. Attributes to be conditioned are measured with various devices. Voltage spikes are most common during electrical storms or malfunctions in the main power lines. The surge protector stops the flow of electricity from reaching a machine by shutting off the power source.

== Design ==
A good quality power conditioner is designed with internal filter banks to isolate the individual power outlets or receptacles on the power conditioner. This eliminates interference or "cross-talk" between components. For example, if the application will be a home theater system, the noise suppression rating listed in the technical specifications of the power conditioner will be very important. This rating is expressed in decibels (db). The higher the db rating, the better the noise suppression.

Active power filters (APF) are filters which can perform the job of harmonic elimination. Active power filters can be used to filter out harmonics in the power system which are significantly below the switching frequency of the filter. The active power filters are used to filter out both higher and lower order harmonics in the power system.

The main difference between active power filters and passive power filters is that APFs mitigate harmonics by injecting active power with the same frequency but with reverse phase to cancel that harmonic, where passive power filters use combinations of resistors (R), inductors (L) and capacitors (C) and do not require an external power source or active components such as transistors. This difference makes it possible for APFs to mitigate a wide range of harmonics.

The power conditioner will also have a "joule" rating. A joule is a measurement of energy or heat required to sustain one watt for one second, known as a watt second. Since electrical surges are momentary spikes, the joule rating indicates how much electrical energy the suppressor can absorb at once before becoming damaged itself. The higher the joule rating, the greater the protection.

== Uses ==
Power conditioners vary in function and size, generally according to their use. Some power conditioners provide minimal voltage regulation while others protect against six or more power quality problems. Units may be small enough to mount on a printed circuit board or large enough to protect an entire factory.

Small power conditioners are rated in volt-amperes (V·A) while larger units are rated in kilovolt-amperes (kV·A).

Ideally electric power would be supplied as a sine wave with the amplitude and frequency given by national standards (in the case of mains) or system specifications (in the case of a power feed not directly attached to the mains) with an impedance of zero ohms at all frequencies.

No real life power feed will ever meet this ideal. Deviations may include:

- Variations in the peak or root mean squared (RMS) voltage are both important to different types of equipment.
- When the RMS voltage exceeds the nominal voltage by 10 to 80% for 0.5 cycle to 1 minute, the event is called a "swell".
- A "dip" (in British English) or a "sag" (in American English – the two terms are equivalent) is the opposite situation: the RMS voltage is below the nominal voltage by 10 to 90% for 0.5 cycle to 1 minute.
- Random or repetitive variations in the RMS voltage between 90 and 110% of nominal can produce a flicker in lighting equipment. A precise definition of such voltage fluctuations that produce flicker has been subject to ongoing debate in more than one scientific community for many years.
- Abrupt, very brief increases in voltage, called "spikes", "impulses", or "surges", generally caused by large inductive loads being turned off, or more severely by lightning.
- "Undervoltage" occurs when the nominal voltage drops below 90% for more than 1 minute. The term "brownout" in common usage has no formal definition but is commonly used to describe a reduction in system voltage by the utility or system operator to decrease demand or to increase system operating margins.
- "Overvoltage" occurs when the nominal voltage rises above 110% for more than 1 minute.
- Variations in the frequency. Mains frequencies are somewhat imprecise target frequencies. It is common for the mains fundamental frequency to subtly change by up to +/-1% during cycling. For example, a 50Hz mains wave may briefly become a 49.91Hz or 50.02Hz wave before moving to some other frequency.
- Variations in the wave shape. These are most often harmonics, occurring when a sine wave signal is split into multiple waves transposed along the x-axis according to factors or multiples of the fundamental (i.e. baseline) frequency (e.g. 100Hz or 150Hz in 50Hz mains regions such as the UK).
- Non-zero low-frequency impedance (when a load draws more power, the voltage drops)
- Nonzero high-frequency impedance (when a load demands a large amount of current, then stops demanding it suddenly, there will be a dip or spike in the voltage due to the inductances in the power supply line)

== See also ==
- Static synchronous series compensator
- Dynamic voltage restoration
- Uninterruptible power supply
- Active filter
