= Lamp rerating =

Model

Lamp rerating is modelling the predicted properties of a filament lamp when running the lamp at a voltage other than its specified rating, using a power law function of voltage. The following equations can be used to estimate the new operating point. The exact value of the exponent parameters will typically vary slightly with the particular lamp design.

V_{a} = Applied voltage
V_{d} = Design voltage

- Rerated current = (V_{a}/V_{d})^{0.55} × current at design voltage
- Rerated luminous intensity = (V_{a}/V_{d})^{3.4 to 3.5} × Luminous intensity at design voltage
- Rerated life = (V_{a}/V_{d})^{−12 to -16} × Life at design voltage
- Rerated electrical power = (V_{a}/V_{d})^{1.6} × Electrical power at design voltage
- Rerated color temperature = (V_{a}/V_{d})^{0.42} × Color temperature at design voltage

== See also ==
- Incandescent light bulb#Light output and lifetime, which has much more detail.
- Halogen lamp#Effect of voltage on performance, for halogen lamps.
