= Dead-beat control =

Problem in control theory

In discrete-time control theory, the dead-beat control problem consists of finding what input signal must be applied to a system in order to bring the output to the steady state in the smallest number of time steps.

For an Nth-order linear system it can be shown that this minimum number of steps will be at most N (depending on the initial condition), provided that the system is null controllable (that it can be brought to state zero by some input). The solution is to apply feedback such that all poles of the closed-loop transfer function are at the origin of the z-plane. This approach is straightforward for linear systems. However, when it comes to nonlinear systems, dead beat control is an open research problem.

== Usage ==
The sole design parameter in deadbeat control is the sampling period. As the error goes to zero within N sampling periods, the settling time remains within the range of Nh, where h is the sampling parameter.

Also, the magnitude of the control signal increases significantly as the sampling period decreases. Thus, careful selection of the sampling period is crucial when employing this control method.

Finally, since the controller is based upon cancelling plant poles and zeros, these must be known precisely, otherwise the controller will not be deadbeat.

== Transfer function of dead-beat controller ==
Consider that a plant has the transfer function

$$\mathbf{G}(z) = \frac{B(z)}{A(z)}$$

where

$$A(z) = a_{0} + a_{1} z^{-1} +  a_{2} z^{-2} + \cdots a_{m} z^{-m},$$

$$B(z) = b_{0} + b_{1} z^{-1} +  b_{2} z^{-2} + \cdots b_{n} z^{-n}.$$

The transfer function of the corresponding dead-beat controller is

$$\mathbf{C}(z) = \frac{A(z)/B(1)}{z^{d} - B(z)/B(1)},$$

where d is the minimum necessary system delay for controller to be realizable. For example, systems with two poles must have at minimum 2 step delay from controller to output, so d = 2.

The closed-loop transfer function is

$$\mathbf{L}(z) = \frac{B(z)/B(1)}{z^d},$$

and has all poles at the origin.
