= Voltage sag =

Short-duration reduction in the voltage of an electric power distribution system

A voltage sag (U.S. English) or voltage dip (British English) is a short-duration reduction in the voltage of an electric power distribution system. It can be caused by high current demand such as inrush current (starting of electric motors, transformers, heaters, power supplies) or fault current (overload or short circuit) elsewhere on the system.

Voltage sags are defined by their magnitude or depth, and duration. A voltage sag happens when the RMS voltage decreases between 10 and 90 percent of nominal voltage for one-half cycle to one minute. Some references define the duration of a sag for a period of 0.5 cycle to a few seconds, and a longer duration of low voltage would be called a sustained sag. The definition of voltage sag can be found in IEEE 1159, 3.1.73 as "A variation of the RMS value of the voltage from nominal voltage for a time greater than 0.5 cycles of the power frequency but less than or equal to 1 minute. Usually further described using a modifier indicating the magnitude of a voltage variation (e.g. sag, swell, or interruption) and possibly a modifier indicating the duration of the variation (e.g., instantaneous, momentary, or temporary)."

== Voltage sag in large power system ==
The main goal of the power system is to provide reliable and high-quality electricity for its customers. One of the main measures of power quality is the voltage magnitude. Therefore, monitoring the power system to ensure its performance is one of the highest priorities. However, since power systems are usually grids including hundreds of buses, installing measuring instruments at every single busbar of the system is not cost-efficient. In this regard, various approaches have been suggested to estimate the voltage of different buses merely based on the measured voltage on a few buses.

== Related concepts ==
The term sag should not be confused with a brownout, which is the reduction of voltage for minutes or hours.

The term transient, as used in power quality, is an umbrella term and can refer to sags, swells, dropouts, etc.

== Swell ==
Voltage swell is the opposite of voltage sag. Voltage swell, which is a momentary increase in voltage, happens when a heavy load turns off in a power system.

== Causes ==
Several factors can cause a voltage sag:

- Some electric motors draw much more current when they are starting than when they are running at their rated speed.
- A line-to-ground fault will cause a voltage sag until the protective switchgear (fuse or circuit breaker) operates.
- Some accidents in power lines such as lightning or a falling object can cause a line-to-ground fault.
- Sudden load changes or excessive loads
- Depending on the transformer connections, transformers energizing
- Voltage sags can arrive from the power utility, but most are caused by local in-building equipment. In residential homes, voltage sags are sometimes seen when refrigerators, air-conditioners, or furnace fans start up.

Factors that affect the magnitude of sag caused by faults:

- The distance between the victim and the fault source
- The fault impedance
- Type of fault
- The voltage before the sag occurs
- System configuration, e.g., system impedance and transformer connections

== See also ==
- Low-voltage ride-through – Electric generator function (LVRT)
- Supply voltage sag – Phenomenon in electronics
- Voltage spike – Short duration voltage transient in an electrical circuit
