= Electric power quality =

Measurement of power meeting specifications

Electric power quality is the degree to which the voltage, frequency, and waveform of a power supply system conform to established specifications. Good power quality can be defined as a steady supply voltage that stays within the prescribed range, steady AC frequency close to the rated value, and smooth voltage curve waveform (which resembles a sine wave). In general, it is useful to consider power quality as the compatibility between what comes out of an electric outlet and the load that is plugged into it. The term is used to describe electric power that drives an electrical load and the load's ability to function properly. Without the proper power, an electrical device (or load) may malfunction, fail prematurely or not operate at all. There are many ways in which electric power can be of poor quality, and many more causes of such poor quality power.

The electric power industry comprises electricity generation (AC power), electric power transmission and ultimately electric power distribution to an electricity meter located at the premises of the end user of the electric power. The electricity then moves through the wiring system of the end user until it reaches the load. The complexity of the system to move electric energy from the point of production to the point of consumption combined with variations in weather, generation, demand and other factors provide many opportunities for the quality of supply to be compromised.

While "power quality" is a convenient term for many, it is the quality of the voltage—rather than power or electric current—that is actually described by the term. Power is simply the flow of energy, and the current demanded by a load is largely uncontrollable.

Frequency stability of some large electrical grids

== Introduction ==
The quality of electrical power may be described as a set of values of parameters, such as:

- Continuity of service (whether the electrical power is subject to voltage drops or overages below or above a threshold level thereby causing blackouts or brownouts)
- Variation in voltage magnitude (see below)
- Transient voltages and currents
- Harmonic content in the waveforms for AC power

It is often useful to think of power quality as a compatibility problem: is the equipment connected to the grid compatible with the events on the grid, and is the power delivered by the grid, including the events, compatible with the equipment that is connected? Compatibility problems always have at least two solutions: in this case, either clean up the power, or make the equipment more resilient.

The tolerance of data-processing equipment to voltage variations is often characterized by the CBEMA curve, which gives the duration and magnitude of voltage variations that can be tolerated.

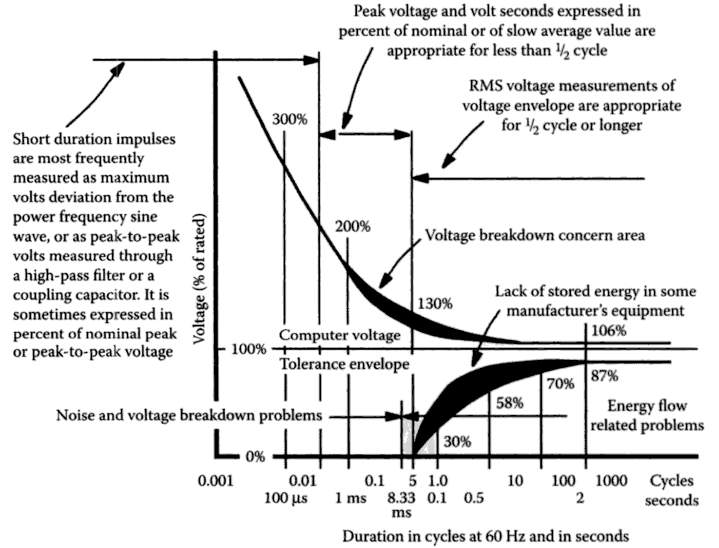
CBEMA curve

Ideally, AC voltage is supplied by a utility as sinusoidal having an amplitude and frequency given by national standards (in the case of mains) or system specifications (in the case of a power feed not directly attached to the mains) with an impedance of zero ohms at all frequencies.

== Deviations ==
No real-life power source is ideal and generally can deviate in at least the following ways:

=== Voltage ===
- Variations in the peak or root mean square (RMS) voltage are both important to different types of equipment.
- When the RMS voltage exceeds the nominal voltage by 10 to 80% for 0.5 cycle to 1 minute, the event is called a "swell".
- A "dip" (in British English) or a "sag" (in American English; the two terms are equivalent) is the opposite situation: the RMS voltage is below the nominal voltage by 10 to 90% for 0.5 cycle to 1 minute.
- Random or repetitive variations in the RMS voltage between 90 and 110% of nominal can produce a phenomenon known as "flicker" in lighting equipment. Flicker is rapid visible changes of light level. Definition of the characteristics of voltage fluctuations that produce objectionable light flicker has been the subject of ongoing research.
- Abrupt, very brief increases in voltage, called "spikes", "impulses", or "surges", generally caused by large inductive loads being turned ON, or more severely by lightning.
- "Undervoltage" occurs when the nominal voltage drops below 90% for more than 1 minute. The term “brownout” aptly describes voltage drops that occur between full power (bright lights) and a blackout (no power, no light). It originates from the noticeable to significant dimming of regular incandescent lights during system faults or overloading, when insufficient power is available to achieve full brightness in domestic lighting. Although this term is commonly used and has no formal definition, it is typically used to describe a reduction in system voltage by the utility or system operator to decrease demand or increase system operating margins.
- "Overvoltage" occurs when the nominal voltage rises above 110% for more than 1 minute.

=== Frequency ===
- Variations in the frequency.
- Nonzero low-frequency impedance (when a load draws more power, the voltage drops).
- Nonzero high-frequency impedance (when a load demands a large amount of current, then suddenly stops demanding it, there will be a dip or spike in the voltage due to the inductances in the power supply line).
- Variations in the wave shape – usually described as harmonics at lower frequencies (usually less than 3 kHz) and described as Common Mode Distortion or interharmonics at higher frequencies.

=== Waveform ===
- The oscillation of voltage and current ideally follows the form of a sine or cosine function, however it can alter due to imperfections in the generators or loads.
- Typically, generators cause voltage distortions and loads cause current distortions. These distortions occur as oscillations more rapid than the nominal frequency, and are referred to as harmonics.
- The relative contribution of harmonics to the distortion of the ideal waveform is called total harmonic distortion (THD).
- Low harmonic content in a waveform is ideal because harmonics can cause vibrations, buzzing, equipment distortions, and losses and overheating in transformers.

Each of these power quality problems has a different cause. Some problems are a result of the shared infrastructure. For example, a fault on the network may cause a dip that will affect some customers; the higher the level of the fault, the greater the number affected. A problem on one customer’s site may cause a transient that affects all other customers on the same subsystem. Problems, such as harmonics, arise within the customer’s own installation and may propagate onto the network and affect other customers. Harmonic problems can be dealt with by a combination of good design practice and well proven reduction equipment.

== Power conditioning ==
Power conditioning is modifying the power to improve its quality.

An uninterruptible power supply (UPS) can be used to switch off of mains power if there is a transient (temporary) condition on the line. However, cheaper UPS units create poor-quality power themselves, akin to imposing a higher-frequency and lower-amplitude square wave atop the sine wave. High-quality UPS units utilize a double conversion topology which breaks down incoming AC power into DC, charges the batteries, then remanufactures an AC sine wave. This remanufactured sine wave is of higher quality than the original AC power feed.

A dynamic voltage regulator (DVR) and static synchronous series compensator (SSSC) are utilized for series voltage-sag compensation.

A surge protector or simple capacitor or varistor can protect against most overvoltage conditions, while a lightning arrester protects against severe spikes.

Electronic filters can remove harmonics.

== Smart grids and power quality ==
Modern systems use sensors called phasor measurement units (PMU) distributed throughout their network to monitor power quality and in some cases respond automatically to them. Using such smart grids features of rapid sensing and automated self healing of anomalies in the network promises to bring higher quality power and less downtime while simultaneously supporting power from intermittent power sources and distributed generation, which would if unchecked degrade power quality.

== Compression algorithm ==
A power quality compression algorithm is an algorithm used in the analysis of power quality. To provide high quality electric power service, it is essential to monitor the quality of the electric signals also termed as power quality (PQ) at different locations along an electrical power network. Electrical utilities carefully monitor waveforms and currents at various network locations constantly, to understand what lead up to any unforeseen events such as a power outage and blackouts. This is particularly critical at sites where the environment and public safety are at risk (institutions such as hospitals, sewage treatment plants, mines, etc.).

=== Challenges ===
Engineers use many kinds of meters, that read and display electrical power waveforms and calculate parameters of the waveforms. They measure, for example:

- current and voltage RMS
- phase relationship between waveforms of a multi-phase signal
- power factor
- frequency
- total harmonic distortion (THD)
- active power (kW)
- reactive power (kVAr)
- apparent power (kVA)
- active energy (kWh)
- reactive energy (kVArh)
- apparent energy (kVAh)
- and many more

In order to sufficiently monitor unforeseen events, Ribeiro et al. explains that it is not enough to display these parameters, but to also capture voltage waveform data at all times. This is impracticable due to the large amount of data involved, causing what is known the “bottle effect”. For instance, at a sampling rate of 32 samples per cycle, 1,920 samples are collected per second. For three-phase meters that measure both voltage and current waveforms, the data is 6–8 times as much. More practical solutions developed in recent years store data only when an event occurs (for example, when high levels of power system harmonics are detected) or alternatively to store the RMS value of the electrical signals. This data, however, is not always sufficient to determine the exact nature of problems.

=== Raw data compression ===
Nisenblat et al. proposes the idea of power quality compression algorithm (similar to lossy compression methods) that enables meters to continuously store the waveform of one or more power signals, regardless whether or not an event of interest was identified. This algorithm referred to as PQZip empowers a processor with a memory that is sufficient to store the waveform, under normal power conditions, over a long period of time, of at least a month, two months or even a year. The compression is performed in real time, as the signals are acquired; it calculates a compression decision before all the compressed data is received. For instance should one parameter remain constant, and various others fluctuate, the compression decision retains only what is relevant from the constant data, and retains all the fluctuation data. It then decomposes the waveform of the power signal of numerous components, over various periods of the waveform. It concludes the process by compressing the values of at least some of these components over different periods, separately. This real time compression algorithm, performed independent of the sampling, prevents data gaps and has a typical 1000:1 compression ratio.

=== Aggregated data compression ===
A typical function of a power analyzer is generation of data archive aggregated over given interval. Most typically 10 minute or 1 minute interval is used as specified by the IEC/IEEE PQ standards. A significant archive sizes are created during an operation of such instrument. As Kraus et al. have demonstrated the compression ratio on such archives using Lempel–Ziv–Markov chain algorithm, bzip or other similar lossless compression algorithms can be significant. By using prediction and modeling on the stored time series in the actual power quality archive the efficiency of post processing compression is usually further improved. This combination of simplistic techniques implies savings in both data storage and data acquisition processes.

== Standards ==
The quality of electricity supplied is set forth in international standards and their local derivatives, adopted by different countries:

EN50160 is the European standard for power quality, setting the acceptable limits of distortion for the different parameters defining voltage in AC power.

IEEE-519 is the North American guideline for power systems. It is defined as "recommended practice" and, unlike EN50160, this guideline refers to current distortion as well as voltage.

IEC 61000-4-30 is the standard defining methods for monitoring power quality. Edition 3 (2015) includes current measurements, unlike earlier editions which related to voltage measurement alone.

== See also ==
- Dynamic voltage restoration
- Rapid voltage change
