= Hornsdale Power Reserve =

Grid-connected battery to increase grid stability under adverse weather events

Coordinates: 33°05′09″S 138°31′06″E

- Country: Australia
- Status: Operational
- Commission date: 1 December 2017
- Construction cost: 172 million AU$
- Owner: Neoen
- Operator: Neoen

Power generation
- Nameplate capacity: 150 MW
- Storage capacity: 193.5 MW h

Hornsdale Power Reserve, colloquially known as the Tesla Big Battery, is a 150 MW (194 MWh) grid-connected energy storage system. The Hornsdale Power Reserve is owned by Neoen and is co-located with the Hornsdale Wind Farm in the Mid North region of South Australia, also owned by Neoen.

The original installation in 2017 was the largest lithium-ion battery in the world at 100 MW / 129 MWh. It was expanded in 2020 to 194 MWh at 150 MW. Despite the expansion, it inevitably lost that title in August 2020 to the Gateway Energy Storage in California, USA. In Australia the large Victorian Big Battery (300 MW / 450 MWh) began operations in December 2021. Those have since been leapfrogged by many other batteries.

== Background ==
In 2016, South Australia suffered grid damages and blackout during storms, as well as high electricity prices. Grid batteries were among the solutions discussed.

South Australia received 90 proposals and considered five projects to build a grid-connected battery to increase grid stability under adverse weather events. This has resulted in less use of gas-fired generators to provide grid stability.

During 2017 Tesla, Inc. won the contract and built the Hornsdale Power Reserve, for a capital cost of A$90 million, leading to the colloquial Tesla Big Battery name.

== Construction ==
Elon Musk placed a wager that the battery would be completed within "100 days from contract signature", otherwise the battery would be free. Tesla had already begun construction, and some units were already operational by 29 September 2017, the time the grid contract was signed. The battery construction was completed and testing began on 25 November 2017. It was connected to the grid on 1 December 2017. The 63 days between grid contract and completion easily beat Musk's wager of "100 days from contract signature", which started when a grid connection agreement was signed with ElectraNet on 29 September 2017, 203 days after Musk's offer on 10 March (in Australia). Samsung 21700-size cells are used.

=== Expansion ===
In November 2019, Neoen announced that it would increase the battery capacity by 50% (50MW/64.5MWh) to a combined 150 MW and 193.5 MWh.

The expansion cost €53 million ($A82 million, whereas A$71 million had been expected), funded by A$15 million from the state government, A$8 million from ARENA and up to A$50 million in loans through the Clean Energy Finance Corporation. The battery receives $4 million per year for essential grid security services.

The increased storage capacity was installed by March 23, 2020, and the expansion became operational on 2 September 2020, increasing the battery's impact in the South Australia grid.

== Operation ==
The battery is owned and operated by Neoen, with the state government having the right to call on the stored power under certain circumstances. Phase one provided a total of 129 megawatt-hours (460 GJ) of storage capable of discharge at 100 megawatts (130,000 hp) into the power grid, which was contractually divided into several parts, covering energy arbitrage, frequency control and stabilisation services. They included:

1. 70 MW running for 10 minutes (11.7 MWh) is contracted to the government to provide stability to the grid (grid services) and prevent load-shedding blackouts while other generators are started in the event of sudden drops in wind or other network issues. This service reduced the cost of grid services to the Australian Energy Market Operator by 90% in its first 4 months.
2. 30 MW for 3 hours (90 MWh) is used by Neoen to store energy when prices are low and sell it when demand is high.

On 14 December 2017, at 1:58:59 am, the Hornsdale Power Reserve (HPR) reacted when unit A3 at Loy Yang Power Station tripped. As its generators spun down over the next 30 seconds, the loss of its 560 MW of base power caused a dip in the system frequency. By 1:59:19, the frequency had fallen to 49.8 Hz, and triggered HPR's response, injecting 7.3 MW into the grid and effectively helping to stabilise the system before the Gladstone Power Station was able to respond at 1:59:27. This synchronverter reaction is a built-in feature, but had not previously been effectively demonstrated.

On 25 May 2021, HPR has reported a successful real-life test of its new “virtual machine mode” by demonstrating an inertial response from a small selection of trial inverters, following the grid disturbances created by events in Queensland. After an upgrade in 2022, the battery has 2,000 MegaWatt-seconds (MWs) of grid inertia, about 15% of the state's total grid requirement.

== Revenues from operation ==
During two days in January 2018 when the wholesale spot price for electricity in South Australia rose due to hot weather, the battery made its owners an estimated A$1,000,000 (US$800,000) as they sold power from the battery to the grid for a price of around A$14,000/MWh. Based on the first six months of operation, the reserve is estimated to earn about A$18 million per year. (This is a third-party estimate, based on spot energy prices; it is possible that the HPR has contracted to provide power at a lower price, in exchange for a more certain income stream.)

External image
- SA FCAS costs by services 2016-2020

After six months of operation, the Hornsdale Power Reserve was responsible for 55% of frequency control and ancillary services in South Australia. The battery usually arbitrages 30 MW or less, but in May 2019 began charging and discharging at around 80 MW and for longer than usual, increasing wind power production by reducing curtailment. FCAS is the main source of revenue. When the Heywood interconnector failed for 18 days in January 2020, HPR provided grid support while limiting power prices. This event was the main contributor to Neoen's €30 million ($A46.3 million) operating profit from Australian battery storage in 2020.

In 2022, HPR started providing an estimated 2,000 MWs of inertial response to the grid. Such services usually being provided by coal and gas generators, HPR was the first big battery in the world to provide such services, and particularly useful given South Australia's high renewable penetration.

== Benefits for the consumers ==
By the end of 2018, it was estimated that the Power Reserve had saved A$40 million in consumer costs, mostly in eliminating the need for a fuel-powered 35 MW Frequency Control Ancillary Service.. In 2019, grid costs were reduced by $116 million due to the operation of HPR. Almost all of the savings delivered by the Hornsdale battery came from its role in frequency and ancillary control markets, where HPR reduced costs by 91% from $470/MWh to $40/MWh; while providing a faster response of 100 ms vs 6000 ms with previous Contingency FCAS agreements. As of 2024, HPR was the largest battery in Australia with grid-forming abilities.

== Controversy ==
On September 23, 2021, the Australian Energy Regulator sued Neoen SA, saying the Hornsdale Power Reserve did not provide backup power during four months in 2019 for which it had received payment. The company was ultimately fined $900,000. The missing ability was later added.

== See also ==
- Battery storage power station
- List of energy storage projects in South Australia
