= Voltage control and reactive power management =

Facets of an ancillary service

Voltage control and reactive power management are two facets of an ancillary service that enables reliability of the transmission networks and facilitates the electricity market on these networks. Both aspects of this activity are intertwined (voltage change in an alternating current (AC) network is effected through production or absorption of reactive power), so within this article the term voltage control will be primarily used to designate this essentially single activity, as suggested by Kirby & Hirst (1997).

Voltage control does not include reactive power injections to dampen the grid oscillations; these are a part of a separate ancillary service, so-called system stability service. The transmission of reactive power is limited by nature (loss of VARs along a high-voltage transmission line can be an order of magnitude higher than loss of watts, "VARs do not travel well"), so the voltage control is provided through pieces of equipment distributed throughout the power grid, unlike the frequency control that is based on maintaining the overall active power balance in the system.

Generally, an increase in production of reactive power corresponds to higher line voltage, while increase of absorption of the reactive power lowers the voltage. In wholesale electricity market, the independent system operator, together with the owners of transmission lines, defines the voltage schedule, a target value or a range of acceptable reference voltages for each generator (typically defined as voltage on the transmission bus). The schedule is typically used as a parameter for the automatic voltage control, although sometimes the control is using the target reactive power ("MVAR") or power factor as a setpoint.

== Need for voltage control ==
Kirby & Hirst indicate three reasons behind the need for voltage control:

1. the power network equipment is designed for a narrow voltage range, so is the power consuming equipment on the customer side. Operation outside of this range can impair performance, shorten equipment life, or cause damage;
2. reactive power causes heating in the generators and the transmission lines, thermal limits will require restricting the production and the flow of real (active) power;
3. injection of reactive power into transmission lines causes losses that waste power, forcing an increase in power supplied by the prime mover.

Use of specialized voltage control devices in the grid also improves the power system stability by reducing the fluctuations of the rotor angle of a synchronous generator (that are caused by generators sourcing or sinking the reactive power).

Power buses and systems that exhibit large changes in voltage when the reactive power conditions change are called weak systems, while the ones that have relatively smaller changes are strong (numerically, the strength is expressed as a short circuit ratio that is higher for the stronger systems).

== Absorption and production of reactive power ==
Electric loads absorb reactive energy if they have lagging power factor (are inductor-like) and produce reactive energy if they have a leading power factor (are capacitor-like). For generator the definition of the current direction is reversed, thus leading generator will absorb reactive power, and lagging will produce it. Due to possible − purely definitional − confusion, it might be convenient to avoid leading/lagging terminology when discussing the production/absorption of the reactive power.

Electric grid equipment units typically either supply or consume the reactive power:

- Synchronous generators will provide reactive power if overexcited and absorb it if underexcited, subject to the limits of the generator capability curve.
- Transformers will always absorb the reactive power.
- Power lines will either absorb or provide reactive power: overhead power lines will provide reactive power at low load, but as the load increases past the surge impedance loading (SIL), the lines start consuming an increasing amount of reactive power. Underground power lines are capacitive, so they are loaded below the SIL and provide reactive power.
- Electrical loads usually absorb the reactive power, with the power factor for typical appliances ranging from 0.65 (household equipment with electrical motors, like a washing machine) to 1.0 (purely resistive loads like incandescent lamps).

In a typical electrical grid, the basics of the voltage control are provided by the synchronous generators. These generators are equipped with automatic voltage regulators that adjust the excitation field keeping the voltage at the generator's terminals within the target range.

The task of additional reactive power compensation (also known as voltage compensation) is assigned to compensating devices:

- passive (either permanently connected or switched) sinks of reactive power (e.g., shunt reactors that are similar to transformers in construction, with a single winding and iron core; some shunt reactors have air core). A shunt reactor is typically connected to an end of a long transmission line or a weak system to prevent overvoltage under light load (Ferranti effect);
- passive sources of reactive power (e. g., shunt or series capacitors).
  - shunt capacitors are used in power systems since the 1910s and are popular due to low cost and relative ease of deployment. The amount of reactive power supplied by a shunt capacitor is proportional to the square of the line voltage, so the capacitor contributes less under low-voltage conditions (frequently caused by the lack of reactive power). This is a serious drawback, as the supply of reactive power by a capacitor drops when it is most needed;
  - series capacitors are used to compensate for the inductive reactance of the loaded overhead power lines. These devices, connected in series to the power conductors are typically used to lower the reactive power losses and to increase the amount of active power that can be transmitted through the line, with the supply of reactive power with self-regulation (the supply fortuitously increases with higher load) being the secondary consideration; The voltage across a series capacitor is typically low (within the regulation range of the network, few percent of the rated voltage), so its construction is relatively low-cost. However, in the case of a short on the load side, the capacitor will be briefly exposed to the full line voltage, thus protection circuits are provisioned, usually involving spark gaps, ZnO varistors, and switches;
- active compensators (e.g., synchronous condensers, static var compensators, static synchronous compensators that can be either sources or sinks of reactive power;
- regulating transformers (e.g., tap-changing transformers).

The passive compensation devices can be permanently attached, or are switched (connected and disconnected) either manually, using a timer, or automatically based on sensor data. The active devices are by nature self-adjusting. The tap-changing transformers with under-load tap-changing (ULTC) feature can be used to control the voltage directly. The operation of all tap-changing transformers in the system needs to be synchronized between the transformers and with the application of shunt capacitors.

Due to the localized nature of reactive power balance, the standard approach is to manage the reactive power locally (decentralized method). The proliferation of microgrids might make the flexible centralized approach more economical.

== Economics ==
In the wholesale electricity markets with separated generation and transmission ownership, the reactive power compensation can be provided in two ways:

- through the devices in the transmission system;
- using the generators ("unbundled" from transmission, this becomes an ancillary service, "Reactive Supply and Voltage Control Service").

In the United States, generators are generally madated to have reactive-power capability over a "standard" power-factor range, commonly 0.95 leading to 0.95 lagging. Historically, some transmission providers compensated generator owners (GOs) for capability within this range, while others did not. In 2024, the Federal Energy Regulatory Commission issued Order No. 904, prohibiting transmission providers from including in transmission rates the charges for generators' reactive-power provision within the standard power-factor range. GOs may receive compensation when requested to operate outside the established power-factor range or when their active-power output is adjusted to provide voltage support.

=== Reactive power reserves ===
The system should be capable of providing additional amounts of reactive power very quickly (dynamic requirement) since a single failure of a generator or a transmission line (that has to be planned for) has the potential to immediately increase the load on some of the remaining transmission lines. The nature of overhead power lines is that as the load increases, the lines start consuming an increasing amount of reactive power that needs to be replaced. Thus a large transmission system requires reactive power reserves just like it needs reserves for the real power. Since the reactive power does not travel over the wires as well as the real power, there is an incentive to concentrate its production close to the load.

Writing in 1997 about the restructuring of the US electricity industry, Kirby and Hirst noted a trend towards requiring customers to operate at a power factor close to unity, thereby reducing their demand for reactive power from the transmission system.

== See also ==
- Active Network Management

== Sources ==
- Casazza, John A.; Loehr, George C. (2000). The Evolution of Electric Power Transmission Under Deregulation: Selected Readings. IEEE. ISBN 978-0-7803-4807-3.
- DeVita, Thomas (November 5, 2021). "Reactive Power Compensation Overview". PJM Interconnection. PJM Reactive Power Compensation Task Force.
- Hofmann, Wolfgang; Schlabbach, Jürgen; Just, Wolfgang (2012-04-23). Reactive Power Compensation. Chichester, West Sussex, U.K Hoboken, N.J: John Wiley & Sons. ISBN 978-0-470-97718-7.
- Ibrahimzadeh, Esmaeil; Blaabjerg, Frede (5 April 2017). "Reactive Power Role and Its Controllability in AC Power Systems". In Naser Mahdavi Tabatabaei; Ali Jafari Aghbolaghi; Nicu Bizon; Frede Blaabjerg (eds.). Reactive Power Control in AC Power Systems: Fundamentals and Current Issues. Springer. pp. 117–136. ISBN 978-3-319-51118-4. OCLC 1005810845.
- Jenkins, Nick; Allan, Ron; Crossley, Peter; Kirschen, Daniel; Strbac, Goran (2000-06-30). Embedded Generation. IET. ISBN 978-0-85296-774-4.
- Khan, Baseem (2022). "Reactive power management in active distribution network". Active Electrical Distribution Network. Elsevier. pp. 287–301. doi:10.1016/B978-0-323-85169-5.00005-8.
- Kirby, Brendan J.; Hirst, Eric (1997). Ancillary service details: Voltage control (ORNL/CON-453) (PDF). Oak Ridge, Tennessee: Oak Ridge National Laboratory.
- Kundur, Prabha (22 January 1994). "Reactive Power and Voltage Control" (PDF). Power System Stability and Control. McGraw-Hill Education. pp. 627–687. ISBN 978-0-07-035958-1. OCLC 1054007373.
