= Wide-area damping control =

Wide-area damping control (WADC) is a class of automatic control systems used to provide stability augmentation to modern electrical power systems known as smart grids. Actuation for the controller is provided via modulation of capable active or reactive power devices throughout the grid. Such actuators are most commonly previously-existing power system devices, such as high-voltage direct current (HVDC) transmission lines and static VAR compensators (SVCs) which serve primary purposes not directly related to the WADC application. However, damping may be achieved with the utilization of other devices installed with the express purpose of stability augmentation, including energy storage technologies. Wide-area instability of a large electrical grid unequipped with a WADC is the result of the loss of generator rotor synchronicity, and is typically envisioned as a generator (or group of generators) oscillating with an undamped exponential trajectory as the result of insufficient damping torque.

== Rotor Instability Phenomena ==
Large interconnected power systems are susceptible to generator rotor instability, particularly when disparate machine groups are connected to the system through high impedance transmission lines. Previously unaccounted for load growth, transmission lines operating closer to rated capacity, connecting two previously electrically isolated subsystems by a single transmission line, and increased renewable resource penetration increase the possibility of lightly-damped oscillations. While several causes of resonance exist in electrical grids, inter-area oscillations pose the greatest threat to wide-spread breakup leading to substantial power outages. Two main sources of inter-area modes are identified: 1.) two previously electrically isolated systems which are connected by a single (or several parallel) transmission lines or 2.) increased load and generation in an existing system without increased transmission capability. Both of these conditions continue to be imposed on most large interconnected systems transitioning to the smart grid architecture.

Rotor instability phenomena may be studied by considering two different disturbance types: small-signal and transient. Small-signal stability considers an electric grid subject to "normal" operating conditions, while transient stability studies the ability of the system to retain stability in the event of a large disturbance (e.g. transmission line fault). While many different features of the electrical grid impact rotor stability (e.g. transmission line congestion, power system stabilizer (PSS) settings, etc.), the WADC architecture introduces sufficient torque to quell the negative effects of resonant systems.

=== Small-Signal Stability ===
Small-signal rotor stability is the ability of a system to retain synchronicity under ambient perturbation. The system is linearizable under such an assumption, facilitating the application of linear system theory for stability assessment and WADC design. The power transferred between two machines serially connected by impedance $X$ with sending voltage $V_s$ and receiving voltage $V_r$ is given by $P={V_{s}V_{r} \over X}\sin\delta$, where $\delta$ is the difference in internal rotor angle of the two machines. Note that to deliver additional power to a load with constant impedance with fixed sending and receiving end voltage, angular separation must increase. Maximum power is transferred between the machines when $\delta=90^{o}$; the two generators lose synchronicity for any angle greater than this value. Nominal operating conditions assume $\delta<40^{o}$ to ensure a sufficient margin of stability. An ever increasing load with fixed power system equipment (e.g. transmission line impedances constant) force electrical grid to operate closer to unacceptable rotor angle ranges. This has the effect of diminishing safety margins for the continuous operation of the system, warranting the implementation of a WADC.

=== Transient Stability ===
The so-called swing equation provides the differential relationship between accelerating power (i.e. the difference between mechanical power at the shaft and electrical power delivered) and the rotor angle. Considering a turbine spinning at sufficiently high speed that perturbations in rotational velocity may be temporarily ignored, the swing equation (assuming no rotational friction loss) may be expressed thusly: $\frac{2H}{\omega_0}\frac{d^2 \delta}{dt^2}=P_m-P_e=P_a$, where $H$ is the inertia constant, $\omega_0$ the nominal system frequency in rad/sec (roughly 377 for a 60 Hz system), $P_e$ the electrical power, and $P_m$ the mechanical power introduced by the prime mover. The swing equation establishes a second-order differential relationship that may be solved analytically or using the equal-area criterion (EAC) for a single-machine infinite bus (SMIB) system. Transient stability considers contingent events of substantial impact on the system that linearization fails to accurately represent the dynamics of interest, including generator trips and transmission line faults. The result of transient analysis provides an indication of whether or not the generators, when perturbed substantially (i.e. allowed to accelerate/decelerate due to power imbalance), will eventually decelerate/accelerate back to an equilibrium point within reason. When dealing with large multi-machine systems, analytical solution is intractable and stability assessment must be transitioned to a nonlinear numerical integration platform.

== Methods of Actuation ==
To enhance the rotor stability of a modern electrical grid, various methods to provide damping have been considered for WADCs. High-voltage DC transmission lines, power system stabilizers, wind turbines,⁣ and flexible AC transmission equipment are capable of attenuating the effects of resonant inter-area oscillatory behavior. Methods employing PSSs frequently modify the generator's local PSS control loop, adding an additional voltage reference term to the automatic voltage regulator (AVR) circuit. Since nominal PSS control design servos based on perturbations in rotational velocity, sensors in addition to a standard rotary encoder are required.

Modulation of active power between several coherent generator sets is a common approach to damping inter-area oscillations. The highest capacity and currently viable actuators are high-voltage DC (HVDC) transmission lines. By modulating the active power shared between converter stations, substantial positive impact may be realized by employing such equipment. HVDC is limited by their quantity of operational lines and difficulty to install new units. Grid-scale batteries have been considered for active power modulation, in addition to HVDC. While providing active power (and hence damping torque) in a similar fashion to HVDC, energy storage devices are limited by capacity and expense. However, large scale aggregation and coordination of electric vehicles battery discharging in vehicle-for-grid (V4G) scheme can overcome such limitations. Energy storage units are more geographically flexible and easily installed than HVDC, however. Static VAR compensators (SVCs) and other reactive devices are also used as actuators in wide-area damping control. Recently, grid-forming (GFM) converters have been considered for the actuation of wide-area damping control schemes. With the participation of grid-forming converters in the wide-area control, the overall dynamics of the power system can be significantly improved.

== Sensory Equipment ==
Due to the geographically disparate nature of actuators, sensor suites must maintain time synchronism. While local caesium atomic clocks offer the highest accuracy time fidelity, GPS technology allows continued synchronicity of measured control feedback signals as they are sent to the aggregated WADC processing center. Without remote sensing capability, the WADC control scheme is severely limited in damping capability. Phasor measurement units (PMUs) are typically preferred to obtain sufficient fidelity in voltage/current angle measurements. These modern sensors provide sufficiently high reporting rate and minimal measurement error required for high-performance control systems. However, latency and the potential for GPS spoofing provide challenges for the implementation of a WADC with PMUs.

== See also ==
- Smart grid
- Voltage regulator
- Wind turbine
- High-voltage direct current
- Utility frequency
- Power system automation
- Electric power transmission
