= Synchronverter =

Type of electrical power inverter

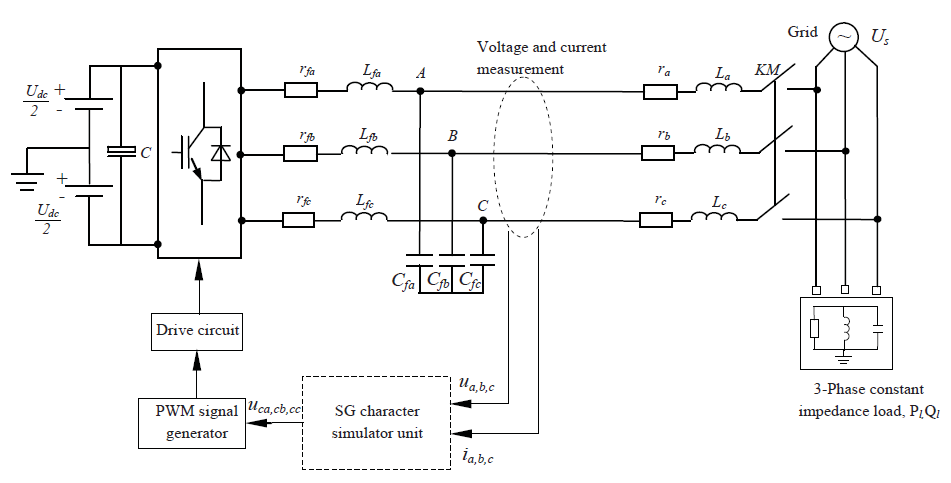
Figure 1. A simple diagram of synchronverter operation environment

Synchronverters (also called virtual synchronous generators or virtual synchronous machines) are inverters which mimic synchronous generators (SG) to provide "synthetic inertia" for ancillary services in electric power systems. Inertia is a property of standard synchronous generators associated with the rotating physical mass of the system spinning at a frequency proportional to the electricity being generated. Inertia has implications towards grid stability as work is required to alter the kinetic energy of the spinning physical mass and therefore opposes changes in grid frequency. Inverter-based generation inherently lacks this property as the waveform is being created artificially via power electronics.

== Background ==
Standard inverters are very low inertia elements. During transient periods, which are mostly because of faults or sudden changes in load, they follow changes rapidly and may cause a worse condition, but synchronous generators have a notable inertia that can maintain their stability.

The grid is designed to operate at a specific frequency. When electric power supply and demand is perfectly balanced the grid frequency will remain at its nominal frequency. However, any imbalance in supply and demand will lead to a deviation from this nominal frequency. It is standard for electricity generation and demand to not be perfectly balanced, but the imbalance is tightly controlled such that the grid frequency remains within a small band of ±0.05 Hz. A synchronous generator’s rotating mass acts as a bank of kinetic energy for the grid to counteract changes in frequency – it can either provide or absorb power from the grid – caused by an imbalance of electric power supply and demand – in the form of kinetic energy by speeding up or slowing down. The change in kinetic energy is proportional to the change in frequency. Because it takes work to speed up or slow down rotating mass, this inertia dampens the effects of active power imbalances and therefore stabilizes the frequency. Because inverter-based generation inherently lacks inertia, increasing penetration of inverter-based renewable energy generation could endanger power system reliability.

Further, the variability of renewable energy sources, primarily concerning photovoltaics (PV) and wind power, could amplify this issue by creating more frequent transient periods of power imbalance. Theoretically, inverter-based generation could be controlled to respond to frequency imbalances by altering its electric torque (active power output). Synthetic inertia is defined as the “controlled contribution of electrical torque from a unit that is proportional to the rate of change of frequency (RoCoF) at the terminals of the unit.” However, in order to have capacity to react to this RoCoF, the participating generators would be required to operate at levels below their maximum output, so that a portion of their output is reserved for this particular response. Further, the inherent variability of production limits the generators' capacity to provide synthetic inertia. This requirement for a reliable and fast-acting power supply makes inverter-based energy storage a better candidate for providing synthetic inertia.

== History ==
Hydro-Québec began requiring synthetic inertia in 2005 as the first grid operator. To counter frequency drop, the grid operator demands a temporary 6% power boost by combining the power electronics with the rotational inertia of a wind turbine rotor. Similar requirements came into effect in Europe in 2016, and Australia in 2020.

== Synchronverter model ==
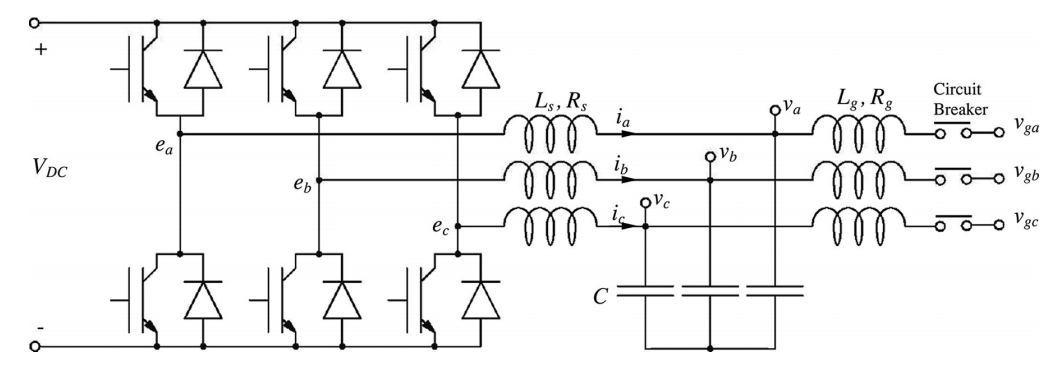
Figure 2. Power part of a synchronverter

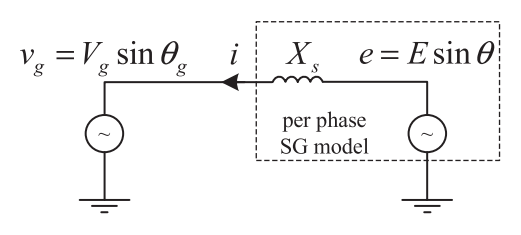
Figure 3. The per-phase model of an SG connected to an infinite bus

Synchronverter structure can be divided into two parts: power part (see figure 2) and electronic part. The power part is energy transform and transfer path, including the bridge, filter circuit, power line, etc. The electronic part refers to measuring and control units, including sensors and digital signal processor (DSP).

The important point in modeling synchronverter is to be sure that it has similar dynamic behavior to Synchronous generator (see figure 3). This model is classified in increasing order of complexity, from 2-order (i.e. electromechanical model, typically derived from the swing equation) up to 7-order model (i.e. including transient, full rotor and stator dynamics). However, 3-order model is widely used because of proper compromise between accuracy and complexity, which combined the electromechanical model with a voltage dynamics equation for one of the flux linkages (typically the q-axis).

The dq-axes components the terminal voltage satisfy the following differential equations:
$$V_{d}(t) =  -R_{s}i_{d} - \frac{d\lambda_{d}}{dt} - \omega \lambda_{q},$$
$$V_{q}(t) =  -R_{s}i_{q} - \frac{d\lambda_{q}}{dt} + \omega \lambda_{d},$$
where the flux linkages are
$$\lambda_{d} = L_{d}i_{d} + \sqrt{3/2}M_{f}i_{f},$$
$$\lambda_{q} = L_{q}i_{q},$$
with $\{i_{d},i_{q}\}$ representing the current as a function of time, $R_{s}$ the stator resistance, $\omega$ the angular velocity of the rotating reference frame, $\{L_{d},L_{q}\}$ the inductances, $M_f i_f$ represents the flux linkage from the rotor field winding and $\{-\omega \lambda_d,\omega\lambda_q\}$ are the rotational emfs or speed voltages internal to the machine due to the rotation of the rotor (i.e. the dq-transformation of the stator reference frame).

While synchronverter terminal voltage and current satisfy these equations, synchronverter can be looked as Synchronous generator. This make it possible to replace it by a synchronous generator model and solve the problems easily.

== Control strategy ==
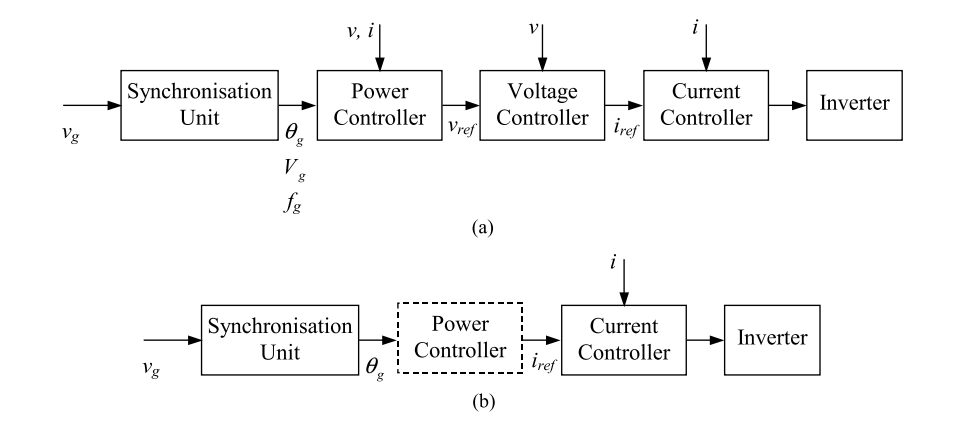
Figure 4. Typical control structures for a grid-connected power inverter.(a) When controlled as a voltage supply.(b) When controlled as a current supply.

As shown in the figure 3, when the inverter is controlled as a voltage source, it consists of a synchronization unit to synchronize with the grid and a power loop to regulate the real power and reactive power exchanged with the grid. The synchronization unit often needs to provide frequency and amplitude. But when inverter is controlled as a current source, the synchronization unit is often required to provide the phase of the grid only, so it is much easier to control it as a current source.

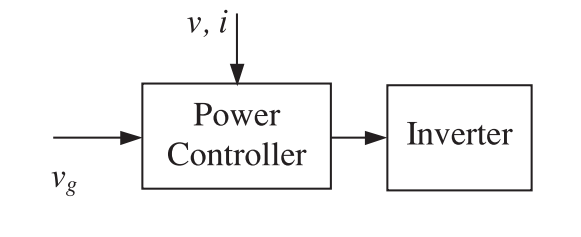
Figure 5. Compact control structure for a grid-connected inverter.

Since a synchronous generator is inherently synchronized with the grid, it is possible to integrate the synchronization function into the power controller without synchronization unit. This results in a compact control unit, as shown in the figure 4.

== Applications ==
=== PV ===
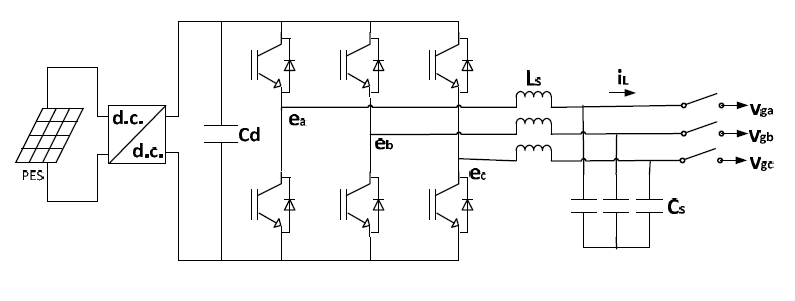
Figure 6. Power part of three-phase synchronverter.

Synchronverters can be treated like synchronous generator, which make it easier to control the source, so it could be widely used in PV primary energy sources (PES).

=== HVDC ===
Source:

=== Wind turbine ===
Source:

=== DC microgrid ===
Synchronverter also is suggested to be used in microgrids because DC sources can be coordinated together with the frequency of the ac voltage, without any communication network.

=== Battery reserve ===
As demonstrated by the Hornsdale Power Reserve in Australia

== See also ==
- Intelligent hybrid inverter
