= WADC =

WADC may refer to:

- Western Australian Development Corporation, a historical Western Australian government entity
- Wright Air Development Center, a forerunner of today's Aeronautical Systems Center, part of the U.S. Air Force
- World Anti-Doping Code, a document of the World Anti-Doping Agency
- Wide-area damping control, a class of automatic control systems
- WARF, a radio station in Akron, Ohio, which held the call sign WADC from 1925 to 1965
- WLYQ, a radio station in Parkersburg, West Virginia, which held the call sign WADC from 1954 to 2018
- Washington, D.C. from an abbreviation of Washington and DC
