= D-curve =

D-curve might refer to:

- D-curve (weighting) a weighting curve used for the measurement of sound pressure level.
- D-curve (electricity) a boundary of the reactive power capability of an electrical generator.
