= Deformed power =

Deformed power is a concept in electrical engineering which characterize the distortion to the sinusoidal states in electric network. It was introduced by Constantin Budeanu in 1927.

It is defined by the following formula:

$$S = \sqrt {P^2 + Q^2 + D^2}$$

where S, P, Q, D are the apparent, active, reactive and deformed powers.

In linear electrical components like electrical resistance occurs no deformed (distortion) power. It is caused by nonlinear loads represented for instance by semiconducting devices (rectifiers, thyristors) especially when used for rectification of an alternating current to a direct one. The rectification is needed especially for providing current for electric traction and electrochemical industry.
