= Cestas Solar Park =

French photovoltaic power station

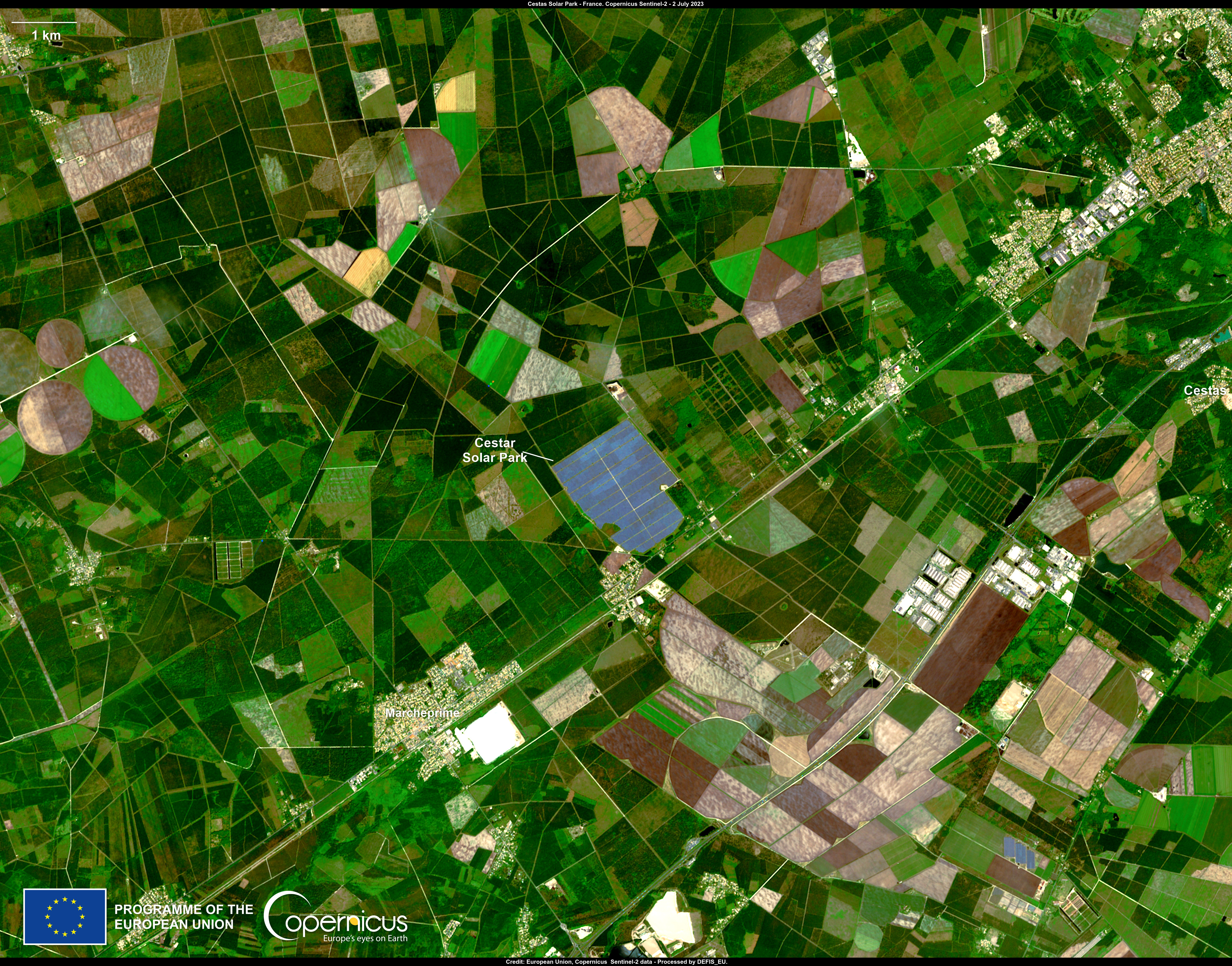
- Country: France
- Location: Gironde
- Coordinates: 44°43′32″N 0°48′57″W
- Commission date: 2015
- Owner: Neoen
- Operator: Neoen

Solar farm
- Type: Flat-panel PV
- Site area: 260 ha (640 acres)

Power generation
- Nameplate capacity: 300 MW
- Annual net output: 342.584518 GWh (2021); 342.65921 GWh (2018); 345.946171 GWh (2022); 349.956172 GWh (2020); 355.37957 GWh (2019)

External links
- Commons: Related media on Commons

The Cestas Solar Park is a 300 megawatt (MW) photovoltaic power station in Cestas, France. Built by Eiffage and Schneider Electric for the developer, Neoen, it opened on December 1, 2015. When it opened on 1 December 2015, Cestas Solar Park was the largest solar photovoltaic power station in Europe . Located in Cestas, to the south of Bordeaux, it spans 260 hectares (640 acres) and produces 300 MWp.

== Energy production ==
When it opened, Cestas was Europe's largest solar park. The power station comprises a million polycristalline silicon modules.

The 300 MWp power station has an annual production of 350 GWh, equivalent to the household consumption (excluding heating) of the 240,000 inhabitants of Bordeaux yet represents less than 0.1% of annual electricity production in France. Alone, the power station has increased net solar power production in metropolitan France by 6% compared to 2014 (5,500 GWh).

Twenty-five 12 MWp power stations are linked together and hooked up to the RTE high voltage electricity transmission network.

Thanks to the east–west panel orientation, production per hectare (of land, not modules) is two to three times greater than a comparable power station with south-facing modules, due to less space required between rows . The park's average surface power density is approximately 15 W per square metre, compared to 3–8 W recorded elsewhere in metropolitan France (Losse, la Colle des Mées, Toul-Rosières, etc.).

== Ownership ==
Neoen owns the land and is the project manager. The company has a 40% share in the power station, with the remaining 60% owned by other shareholders. Neoen entrusted a consortium led by Clemessy (branch of French group Eiffage) with the design, construction and maintenance of the power station in partnership with Schneider Electric and the French branch of Krinner.

== Operator ==
Neoen has entrusted Clemessy with the operation and maintenance of the solar plant.

== History ==
Construction began in November 2014 and the power station was commissioned in October 2015. The park was officially opened on 1 December 2015 . The power station is directly linked to the electricity transmission network.

Supply to French electricity provider EDF was set at €105 per MWh for a period of 20 years – cheaper than the production of the planned European Pressurized nuclear Reactors (EPR) .

The solar panels at Cestas, which represent 45% of the overall cost of the project, were supplied by the world's top three manufacturers (Yingli Solar, Trina Solar and Canadian Solar), at the time the only companies able to supply the required volume and homogeneity. Neoen turned to French companies for the electrical installation: Clemessy, a branch of Eiffage, oversaw the project, Nexans supplied the 4000 km of cable and Schneider Electric the high voltage unit, the transformers and inverters.

A just-in-time method was devised for construction, with tractor-towed platforms to transport panels. The project delivered significant numbers of construction jobs -up to 250 workers at peak activity.

== Investment and selling price ==
A total of 360 million euros was invested in the project. The variable supply of electricity is sold to EDF at €104.5 per MWh. In comparison, the price announced for the non-variable supply from the planned Hinkley Point C nuclear power station is €109 (£92.50) per MWh at 2012 prices.

== See also ==
- Solar power in France
- Photovoltaic power stations
- List of largest power stations in the world
- List of photovoltaic power stations
