= Active Network Management =

Electricity grid management

In electricity distribution circuits, Active Network Management (ANM) describes control systems that manage generation and load for specific purposes. This is usually done to keep system parameters (voltage, power, phase balance, reactive power and frequency) within predetermined limits. ANM generally refers to automated systems.

== Details ==
Real-time or near-real-time measurements are used with a model of the system to determine the control signals that need to be sent to users and generators. These will be requests to adjust power or other parameters. Other equipment can also be included in an ANM system that balances phases, pushes or pulls reactive power or switches circuits to achieve the desired results. The results of the requested changes are monitored and fed back into the data model.

Predictive and forecasting methods may be used to prepare the network for anticipated conditions. This may include delaying load from being connected if an increase in power generation (say from wind turbines, solar power, or tidal generators) is expected in the near future. It may also include bringing on load ahead of schedule (say water pumping or energy storage) ahead of anticipated uncontrollable load—especially domestic or industrial use.

Some systems may include an element of human intervention. This is particularly important for large and complex systems where an accurate, predictive model is impossible to produce. Anticipating human behavior is best done by humans rather than by machines and national grid companies ultimately rely on a team of experienced experts to balance the system.

One purpose of an ANM system can be to allow additional generating capacity to be attached to the existing electrical grid whilst allowing the generators to be shut off if the capacity of the infrastructure might be overloaded under certain conditions; while permitting the generators to be used more effectively if the grid is later "reinforced". (Note: "Reinforced" in this context typically means upgrading cables, equipment, etc. so they are able to cope with a high power without overheating or other problematic effects)

== Examples ==
- The ANM system on the Orkney is claimed have been the first such system in the British Isles in 2009.

== See also ==
- Voltage control and reactive power management
- Smart grids
