= Western Downs Green Power Hub =

Solar power station in Queensland, Australia

- Country: Australia
- Location: 22km southeast of Chinchilla, Queensland
- Coordinates: 26.955°S 150.677°E
- Status: Operational
- Construction began: June 2020
- Construction cost: $600 million
- Owner: Neoen
- Operator: Neoen

Solar farm
- Type: Flat-panel PV
- Collectors: 1,000,000
- Site area: 1,500 hectares (3,700 acres)

Power generation
- Nameplate capacity: 400 MW

External links
- Website: https://westerndownsgreenpowerhub.com.au/

Western Downs Battery
- Country: Australia
- Coordinates: 34.9°S 137.7°E
- Construction began: January 2023
- Commission date: 2025
- Owner: Neoen
- Operator: Neoen

Power generation
- Nameplate capacity: 540 MW
- Storage capacity: 1,080 MWh

External links
- Website: westerndownsgreenpowerhub.com.au

The Western Downs Green Power Hub is a large renewable energy project owned and operated by Neoen near Chinchilla in Queensland, Australia. It consists of the 460 MWp (direct current) Western Downs Solar Farm and a 540 MW / 1080 MWh grid battery. The solar farm consists of over one million solar panels to generate 400 megawatts of (alternating current) power. It utilizes 72-cell bi-facial solar modules on single-axis trackers; a system that tracks the sun throughout the day. It was the largest solar farm in Australia for some time.

The 1,500 hectare solar farm is owned and operated by Neoen. The state government-owned renewable energy operator CleanCo Queensland has signed an agreement to purchase 80% of the project's capacity.

Construction began in June 2020. The solar farm was built by Sterling & Wilson. Exports to the grid had begun by August 2022. The final solar panel was installed on 1 May 2023. The event was attended by state premier Annastacia Palaszczuk.

The 540 MW / 1080 MWh big battery with grid forming inverters has 3 stages. Construction of Stage 1 of the battery had begun by January 2023, and completed in June 2025. Construction of Stage 2 began in August 2024, and completed in September 2025. The PV station and battery, along with two other batteries, are connected to the national grid via the Western Downs substation and a new 275 kilovolt line constructed by Powerlink Queensland. Battery containers for a 270 MW / 540 MWh section are made in Shanghai.

Construction of Stage 3 with 305 MW / 1,220 MWh (4 hour) starts in 2026, expected operating by 2028, making the battery numbers combined 845 MW / 2,300 MWh.

== See also ==
- List of solar farms in Queensland
- Renewable energy in Australia
- Solar power in Australia
