= 2016 South Australian blackout =

Power outage in South Australia

- Date: 28 September 2016
- Duration: 24 Hours – 1 Week
- Location: Statewide
- Cause: Storm damage
- Inquiries: Australian Energy Market Operator and Australian Energy Regulator investigations
- Litigation: Australian Energy Regulator legal action against four energy suppliers

The South Australian blackout of 2016 was a widespread power outage in South Australia that occurred as a result of storm damage to electricity transmission infrastructure on 28 September 2016. The cascading failure of the electricity transmission network resulted in almost the entire state losing its electricity supply, affecting 850,000 SA customers. Kangaroo Island did not lose its supply, as the Kangaroo Island power station had been built to supply the island for the contingency of a failure in the power cable under the Backstairs Passage.

== Storms ==
On the day of the failure, South Australia experienced a violent storm reported as being a once-in-50-years event. There was gale force and storm force wind across wide areas of the state. There were at least seven tornadoes, which damaged multiple elements of critical infrastructure. The state was hit by at least 80,000 lightning strikes; the grid operator had not anticipated substantial lightning risks to the transmission system and therefore had taken no protective actions. The wind damaged a total of 23 pylons on electricity transmission lines, including damage on three of the four interconnectors connecting the Adelaide area to the north and west of the state.

== Power grid ==
The South Australian power grid is operated by ElectraNet and connected to the National Electricity Market via two interconnectors to Victoria. These are the Heywood interconnector (which had recently been upgraded to 650 MW at 275 kV) in the southeast of the state and the Murraylink (220 MW at 150 kV) HVDC further north, connecting Berri to Red Cliffs in Victoria. The Heywood interconnector had been down for upgrade earlier in the year, and was initially blamed for the widespread outage.

== Blackout ==
The weather had resulted in localised power outages throughout the day and by around 3:50 p.m. local time, almost the entire state power grid had been cut out. Early indications were that as the transmission lines in the Mid North failed due to damaged pylons, the automatic safety features in the network isolated the generators to protect both the generation facilities and the end consumers' equipment. Over a short period, this resulted in most of the state's distribution network being powered down as the transmission network acted to protect the infrastructure.

The preliminary report from the Australian Energy Market Operator (AEMO) identified that problems started 90 seconds before the eventual failure. The first line to trip was a 66 kV line near Adelaide, and it was automatically reset. The first major fault was 47 seconds later when two phases of the 275 kV line between Brinkworth and Templers grounded. The Davenport–Belalie line tripped with one phase to ground, was automatically reset, but tripped again nine seconds later, so was isolated for manual inspection, with the fault estimated to be 42 km (26 mi) from Davenport. One second later (7 seconds before the state went dark), the Hallett Wind Farm reduced output by 123 MW. Four seconds later, a third 275 kV transmission line showed a fault, the Davenport–Mount Lock is on the other side of the same towers as Davenport–Belalie, and the fault was estimated to be 1 km (0.6 mi) further on. The damaged power lines caused 5–6 voltage glitches which stressed the ride-through capability of most of the wind farm capacity, causing nine of them to shut down: Finally, all within one second, the Hornsdale Wind Farm reduced output by 86 MW, Snowtown Wind Farm reduced output by 106 MW, the Heywood interconnector flow increased to over 850 MW. Both of its circuits tripped out due to imminent loss of synchronism across the network between South Australia and the eastern states. This occurred before the interconnector circuits' thermal load limits were reached. Supply was then lost to the entire South Australian region of the National Electricity Market, as the Torrens Island Power Station, Ladbroke Grove Power Station, Murraylink interconnector and all remaining wind farms tripped.

AEMO identified software settings in the wind farms that prevented repeated restarts once voltage or frequency events occurred too often. The group of wind turbines that could accept nine ride-throughs in 120 seconds stayed on line through much of the event before the system went black. The rather larger group of turbines that could not accept this many repeated ride-throughs dropped out, instigating the overload and shutdown of the interconnector, and hence the electricity supply. AEMO has suggested better fault ride-through capability for the wind farms. The high wind speed caused 20 MW of wind power to disconnect to prevent overspeed.

In 2019, the Australian Energy Regulator initiated proceedings in the Federal Court of Australia against the operators of four wind farms. It alleged that these companies had failed to comply with performance requirements to ride through major disruptions and disturbances. The companies AGL Energy, Neoen, Pacific Hydro and Tilt Renewables operated several of the large wind farms that tripped during the incident including Hallett, Hornsdale, Clements Gap and Snowtown.

== Restoration ==
As so much of the network had been shut down, the authorities needed to act carefully to bring it back online and provide a stable network. This was initiated in the first few hours following the start of the outage, initially using the Victorian interconnectors to establish a stable frequency on the network, and gradually add South Australia's power generators to the network and restore power to areas as soon as possible. The initial focus was to restore power to the Adelaide metropolitan area, and suburbs started to regain power within about three hours, and much of the city power was restored by 10 p.m. By the following morning, power had been restored to most of the areas of Adelaide and the areas south and east of it that did not have storm damage to the distribution network. The substantial damage to the transmission network north of Adelaide meant that large areas of the Mid North and Eyre Peninsula did not have power restored within 24 hours, and further damaging weather indicated that it could be at least the end of the weekend before some of those areas were restored.

AEMO had contracts with two "System Restart Ancillary Services" (SRAS) providers to help bring the network back up. The Mintaro Emergency Diesel Generator had suffered storm damage, including a cloud-to-ground lightning strike in very close proximity, but would not have been useful anyway due to its location in the network and downed transmission lines. The Quarantine Power Station was unable to start the larger Unit #5 required to provide enough power to restart any of the Torrens Island Power Station units, so Torrens Island needed power from the Victorian interconnector to be restarted. A circuit breaker in the Quarantine Power Station switchyard connecting Torrens Island Power Station and the smaller units at Quarantine Power Station with Unit #5 tripped repeatedly due to in-rush current on the generator transformer and auxiliary transformer, and subsequently ran out of stored energy before Unit #5 could be started.

By the morning of Friday 30 September 2016, about 10,000 properties had not yet had power restored since the blackout on Wednesday afternoon, and 18,000 more had lost power due to distribution network faults caused by continued stormy weather. An additional transmission line fault near Tumby Bay was only detected as ElectraNet tried to power up the system, and this fault prevented the power generator in Port Lincoln from being used to power the lower Eyre Peninsula.

Due to the extensive nature of the damage, temporary transmission towers were sent by Western Power; these towers can reach a height of 58 metres and take only one day to erect. It is expected that the towers will remain in use for 6 to 12 months while the permanent repairs are made.

== Consequences ==
The Flinders Medical Centre, a major hospital in Adelaide's southern suburbs, was affected when the fuel pump for the diesel-powered back-up generator failed after operating for about an hour. As a result, 17 patients were transferred from the intensive care unit to the adjacent Flinders Private Hospital, which still had an operating generator. Several embryos were also lost at Flinders Fertility.

The zinc smelter operated by Nyrstar at Port Pirie was expected to be shut down for several weeks, as the diesel back-up generator failed after about four hours, and the content of the smelter cooled and solidified.

== Immediate political responses ==
A number of politicians commented whilst the emergency was unfolding. Prime Minister Malcolm Turnbull said state governments had paid "little or no attention to energy security", while Deputy Prime Minister Barnaby Joyce told ABC "[Windpower] wasn't working too well last night, because they had a blackout".

Energy minister Josh Frydenberg said that "energy security was the (federal) government's "number one priority". He later said "it has to be underlined that this was a major weather event."

South Australian senator Nick Xenophon said he supported renewable energy but that the state's approach relied too much on wind. South Australian Premier Jay Weatherill said Xenophon had "jumped the shark" as the situation was yet to be analysed.

Queensland One Nation senator Malcolm Roberts urged all governments to "exit all climate change policies" while South Australian Greens senator Sarah Hanson-Young said it was "pathetic" that people were politicking while emergency service officers and volunteers are flat out responding.

Opposition Leader Bill Shorten accused the Coalition of "playing politics with what is a natural disaster" and that there was no link between the storm damage and the state's renewable energy target.

The Grattan Institute's Tony Wood was reported as saying "If you've got a wind farm or a coal-fired power station at the end of a transmission line, and that system either is taken out by a storm or is forced to shut down to protect itself from a storm, it doesn't matter what the energy source is" while Clean Energy Council's Tom Butler said the weather event "created a fault in the system which has caused the generation to trip offline" and that "the Snowtown wind farm, north of Adelaide, was actually helping to prop up the state's power supply ahead of gas power stations as the network was gradually brought back online."

Victorian Premier Daniel Andrews told ABC radio that Turnbull had conflated two issues, that "the poles and wires had blown over".

== Ensuing flood ==
Following the power outages, the same storm resulted in major flooding, which was dubbed "unrelenting" by South Australia Services Minister Peter Malinauskas. A flood emergency was issued for towns and suburbs north of Adelaide. Flood warnings were also issued for the Adelaide hills area.

== December 2016 blackouts ==
Further widespread blackouts occurred beginning late on Tuesday 27 December 2016, with areas losing power for upwards of twelve hours following severe storms causing damage to over 300 powerlines in the electricity distribution network. The storms also caused flooding and wind damage, including property destruction due to fallen trees. A total of 155,000 properties lost power at the peak of the storms, requiring over 1200 repair jobs resulting from over 350 powerlines being damaged. As of 7.30pm on Thursday 29 December, there were more than 11,500 households still without power across the state, some for up to forty-six hours, in regions including the Adelaide Hills, Mid-North, Flinders Ranges, and Murraylands. By 9am on Saturday 31 December, there were still more than 1600 households without power for more than 80 hours, primarily across the Adelaide Hills.

== February 2017 blackouts ==
On 8 February 2017, over 90,000 households in Adelaide lost power for 45 minutes in the middle of a major heatwave. The Australian Energy Market Operator (AEMO) ordered 100 MW of load shedding, but 300 MW was cut, causing controversy with the state government. The state Energy Minister, Tom Koutsantonis said that the state had spare generation capacity but the market didn't turn that generation on, as the 165 MW second unit at Pelican Point power station had gas and was ready to go. AEMO stated that it had sent notices to all generators, requesting a market response due to increased demand but it did not receive sufficient bids into the market to maintain the supply/demand balance in South Australia. Engie, the operator of Pelican Point, responded that the Market Rules did not permit it to make a market response unless directed by the market operator. This was authorised the next day to avoid a repeat on 9 February. The owner later clarified that it was not allowed to bid into the market if supply cannot be guaranteed, and it did not have a current gas supply contract for the second unit. It was able to respond promptly once directed to do so on 9 February during continuing high temperature weather.

== See also ==
- 2016 Tasmanian energy crisis
- Energy crisis
