= Rating plate =

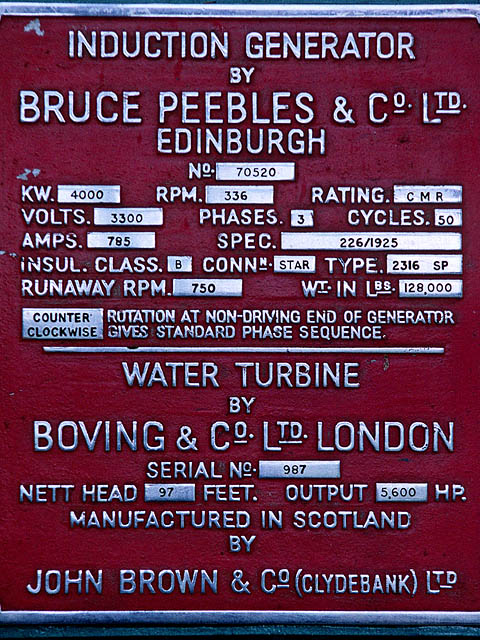
The rating plate of a generator at the Dalchonzie power station with continuous maximum rating (CMR) of 4 megawatts

A rating plate on a machine carries information about its operational limits. The plate frequently contains the names of the machine and its manufacturer, so the rating plate is often called a name plate (hence the term "nameplate capacity" for a generator), although many devices carry separate nameplates and rating plates.

For an electric machine, the power rating is the number on its rating plate and corresponds to a maximum electric load it can carry. There is a distinction between the continuous rating (for generators, continuous maximum rating or CMR), at which the machine can be operational without a time limit and short-term rating that can only be used for a specified amount of time.

== Generators ==
A typical electrical generator rating plate contains the following parameters:

- power rating is specified in terms of apparent power (KVA or MVA), since the exact power factor will be determined by the external factors;
- power factor (PF) is the nominal power factor for other ratings; usually PF = 0.8;
- insulation class (B, F, H) for the primary coil. Typical value is F, although older generators might use class B;
- type of enclosure (IP code);
- rated voltage can be either line to line ("line voltage") or phase to neutral ("phase voltage");
- rated current is derived from the rated power and voltage: ${ratedCurrent} = \frac {apparentPower} {lineVoltage}$;
- line frequency (50 Hz or 60 Hz) and rotational speed of the prime mover in RPM;
- connection (star or delta).

== See also ==
- Per-unit system

== Sources ==
- Reddy, B.K. (2021). "Rating Plates". Electrical Equipment: A Field Guide. Wiley. ISBN 978-1-119-77168-5.
