= Neoen =

French renewable energy producer

- Type: French société par actions simplifiée
- Industry: Electricity
- Founded: 2008
- Headquarters: Paris, France
- Area served: Australia; Europe; Central America; Southern America; North America
- Key people: Xavier Barbaro
- Products: Electric power from renewable sources
- Revenue: 533.1 million euros in 2024
- Total assets: 8.6 billion euros in December 2024
- Owner: Brookfield
- Number of employees: 461 (31 December 2024
- Parent: Impala SAS, BPI France
- Website: www.neoen.com/en

Neoen is a French producer of exclusively renewable energy headquartered in Paris, France. Founded in 2008, it develops, finances, builds and operates solar power plants, onshore wind farms and energy storage solutions. As at the end of August 2025, the company's total capacity was 8.2 GW, made up of 49% solar, 27% wind and 24% battery storage. Neoen aims to deliver an additional 10 GW by 2030.

Neoen is owner and operator of the Cestas solar plant (near Bordeaux, France), the largest of its kind in Europe (300 MWp) at the time of its commissioning in 2015; Mutkalampi, the largest wind farm in Finland (404 MW); the Collie Battery (560 MW / 2.240 MWh), one of the largest batteries in the world; and of Providencia Solar (101 MWp), the largest solar plant in Central America at the time of its commissioning in 2017 and of one of the largest solar farms in Australia: Western Downs Solar Farm.

== History ==
Founded in 2008, Neoen opened its first power plant in France in 2009 and reached its breakeven point in 2011. In 2014, the company began its international development with the opening of three solar plants in Portugal: Seixal, Coruche and Cabrela. Cestas, the most powerful solar plant in Europe with 300 MWp, was opened in south-west France in 2015. In 2016 Neoen commissioned the largest solar park in Central America (101 MWp). The company's total capacity in operation or under construction exceeded 1 GW. The following year (2017), Neoen commissioned the worlds’ first big battery, Hornsdale Power Reserve, in Hornsdale, Australia (100 MW/129 MWh) and announced its intention to triple its business by 2020.

The company went public on 16 October 2018, entering Euronext compartment A, with the support of its historical shareholders. It became the youngest French company in its field to surpass a capitalization of one billion euros. The same year, its total capacity in operation or under construction reached 2 GW.

In 2019, Neoen sold its only biomass unit and continued its international expansion, with an agreement to provide wind power for Google in Finland and the financing of a 375-MWp solar park in Mexico providing energy at US$18.93 per MWh. That year, the company reached the milestone of 1 GW of assets in Australia alone.

In 2020, building work began on the Yllikkälä Power Reserve in Finland (30 MW/30 MWh) Work also began on Western Downs (460 MWp), Neoen's largest solar park and the largest of its kind in Australia.

In June 2020, the company entered the SBF120, MSCI France Small Cap Index and S&P Global Clean Energy indexes.

In April 2021 Neoen increased its capital by €600 million. The company had 4.1 GW in operation or under construction in 15 countries and set itself the target of reaching 10 GW in 2025.

In July 2021 Neoen reached the milestone of 1 GW of renewable energy under operation or construction in France. In December 2021, the Victorian Big Battery (300 MW / 450 MWh) was commissioned. It is the largest battery in Australia and one of the biggest in the world, and it is now owned by HMC Capital. Also in December, the company also began construction of its largest wind farm, Goyder South Stage 1 (412 MW) in South Australia.

In 2022, Neoen signed Corporate Power Purchase Agreements totalling c.1 GW on assets in Australia, Finland, France and Sweden, including a baseload PPA with BHP to supply the Olympic Dam mine in South Australia. At the same time, the company began building the Fox Coulée solar plant in Alberta, its first in Canada.

The beginning of construction work on Blyth Battery in South Australia in late 2022 took Neoen over the 1 GW mark in storage capacity. The company then totalled nearly 6.6 GW in operation or under construction.

In March 2023, Neoen undertook a second capital increase, of €750 million, with the intention of increasing installed capacity by 50% and stepping up investment in storage. The company's expansion continued over the first half of 2023, with the start of construction of several wind farms and batteries, most notably in the Nordic countries and Australia. These projects bring Neoen's capacity in operation or under construction in Finland to more than 700 MW. In June, Neoen launched the construction of its first long-duration battery in Australia (Collie Battery, 197 MW/4 hours).

In early 2024, Neoen reached 1 GW of renewable energy capacity in the Nordics. In France, it is a consistent top winner in CRE calls for tenders in the ground-mounted power plants category, with awards amounting to 479 MWp over two years. In June 2024, Neoen topped 4 GW in operation or under construction in Australia.

In May 2024, Brookfield, a leading global investment firm, enters into exclusive negotiations with Impala and other shareholders to acquire a majority stake in Neoen. On December 30, Brookfield completed the purchase of a 53.12% stake in the company for 3.25 billion euros.

Following the Offer period, which ran from 13 February to 13 March 2025, Brookfield finalized the squeeze-out procedure on April 4, 2025. Since then, Neoen has not been publicly listed.

In 2025, Neoen continued its expansion in Europe with the construction of its first asset in Germany (Arneburg Battery, 45 MW / 90 MWh), and the inauguration of the largest solar farms in Portugal (Rio Maior, 272 MWp) and Sweden (Hultsfred, 100 MWp).

In July 2025, Neoen signed four new long-term corporate power purchase agreements with SNCF Énergie, with durations ranging from 20 to 25 years. Starting January 1, 2026, Neoen will supply SNCF Voyageurs with 137 GWh of renewable electricity annually, produced by four of its farms with a combined capacity of 111 MWp.

In September 2025, Neoen signed a 10-year electricity supply contract with BHP, advancing Neoen’s total contribution to the energy transition in South Australia.

On 1st August 2025, Neoen completed the divestment of its Victorian assets in Australia to HMC Capital. The divestment formed part of the commitments made by Brookfield to obtain the regulatory approval from the Australian Competition and Consumer Commission (ACCC), which was needed for Brookfield to acquire a majority stake in Neoen from Impala and other Neoen shareholders. The divestment included Neoen’s operating assets in Victoria (Victorian Big Battery, Numurkah Solar Farm, and Bulgana Wind Farm and Battery) as well as six projects in the development pipeline: Navarre Green Power Hub, Kentbruck Green Power Hub, Kentbruck Battery, Moorabool Battery, Loy Yang Wind, and Bulgana Battery Extension.

== Activities ==
Neoen operates in the solar power, onshore wind farm and battery storage markets.

Its turnover for 2024 was €533.1 million, made up of 39% solar power (€207.7 million), 43% wind power (€229.4 million) and 18% storage (€95 million).

As at December 2024, Neoen is present in 14 countries across three geographic regions: Australia (49% of capacity in operation or under construction); Europe 40%; and the Americas (11%). As at the end of August 2025, its capacity in operation or under construction is 8.2 GW.

=== Photovoltaic ===
Neoen's main solar plants are in Argentina, Australia, Canada, France, Ireland, Italy, Mexico, El Salvador, Portugal and Sweden.

In France, Neoen built and operates the Cestas solar farm, in the Gironde department. With 980,000 solar panels, the 260-hectare farm was the largest of its kind in Europe when it opened on 1 December 2015. At 300 MWp it remains one of the largest in France. With an annual production of 350 GWh, it can cover household consumption for the 240,000 inhabitants of Bordeaux (excluding heating).

Neoen is operator of Providencia Solar, (101 MWp) in El Salvador, the biggest solar power plant in Central America at the time of commissioning in 2016. In 2017, the 140 MWp Capella Solar project reinforced the company's presence in El Salvador. Neoen is now also developing projects in Argentina and plans to build two 100-MWp solar farms near San Antonio de los Cobres in the province of Salta. In Mexico the company developed and operates the 800-hectare El Llano farm in central Mexico (375 MWp).

In 2020, Neoen announced the construction of the Western Downs Green Power Hub (460 MWp), Australia's largest solar park. Spanning 1,545 hectares (equivalent to 2100 football pitches), the new farm has been operational since end of 2023 and will produce up to 1,080 GWh per year.

In 2021, Neoen commissioned its Altiplano solar plant (208 MWp) in Argentina. Situated at an altitude of 4,000 metres above sea level, the site has some of the highest levels of solar irradiance in the world.

In 2022, Neoen launched the construction of the Fox Coulée solar power plant (93 MWp), the company's first farm in Canada, and the Rio Maior solar power plant (272 MWp), the largest in Portugal. Neoen has also made agrisolar energy a major focus of its development in France, with almost half of its projects integrating an agricultural component.

Neoen has continued to develop its solar activities around the world. The company announced its intentions in Sweden, where it began construction of the country's largest solar plant, Hultsfred (100 MWp) in October 2023, under contract to sell 95% of its production to H&M group. In Italy, the construction of the first three solar plants started in late 2023. Neoen, the renewable energy leader in Australia, has also launched construction of Culcairn solar farm, which, at 440 MWp is one of the company's largest solar asset.

In 2024, in Ireland, Neoen was awarded two projects for a total capacity of 170 MWp, scheduled to be operational in 2027 and 2028. Neoen also started the construction of the 79 MWp Ballinknockane solar farm, which is expected to be energized mid-2026 and fully operational in the first half of 2027.

Neoen remains the first independent producer of renewable energy in France beginning of 2024. In 2024 the company signed a PPA contract with SNCF, the energy produced at Le Couret (139 MWp) agrisolar farm will power the equivalent of the Paris-Marseille high-speed train link.

With 164 MWp of ground-mounted PV projects awarded over the year in calls for tender issued by the French government's Energy Regulation Commission (CRE), Neoen remains the top awardee in Programmation Pluriannuelle de l’Energie PPE2, bringing its secured solar capacity in the country to over 2,500 MW.

By the end of 2024, Neoen and Equinix signed the first PPA in Italy (their 5th one overall), securing 53 MW of solar energy in Italy for a duration of 10 years.

As at end of December 2024, Neoen is edging towards one hundred solar power plants in operation or under construction around the world, for a total capacity of 4.1 GWp.

In 2025, Neoen inaugurated the largest solar farm in Portugal, made up of the Rio Maior Solar Farm (204 MWp) and the Torre Bela Solar Farm (68 MWp). This project brings Neoen’s total capacity in operation or under construction in Portugal to 326 MWp.

Neoen also inaugurated the largest solar farm in Sweden, the Hultsfred Solar Farm, with a capacity of 100 MWp. The project is supported by a long-term power purchase agreement (PPA) signed in 2022 with the H&M Group. This agreement plays a key role in H&M Group’s goal to source 100% renewable electricity by 2030 at the latest.

In September 2025, Neoen was awarded three photovoltaic projects with a combined capacity of 46.8 MWp as part of the latest government tender in France.

=== Wind power ===
Neoen's wind power operations are focused on five countries where wind resources are abundant: Australia, France, Finland, Ireland, and Sweden. The 60 plants in operation or under construction have a combined capacity of 2.4 GW (as at 31 December 2024).

In 2017, Neoen commissioned the first phase of its Hornsdale Wind Farm in Australia, with 99 wind turbines and a capacity of 316 MW.

On 3 July 2020, Neoen announced the commissioning of its Hedet wind farm in Finland. The 81-MW farm supplies Google with green electricity for its data centre in Hamina.

In 2021, Neoen began construction on the Kaban Green Power Hub (157 MW) and Goyder South Stage wind farm (412 MW) in Australia.

On 14 May 2022, Neoen inaugurated the Madon-Moselle wind farm in France (39.6 MW). The company also opened two wind farms in the Nordics in 2022: Björkliden (40.4 MW) with partner Prokon in Finland and Storbrännkullen (57.4 MW), Neoen's first wind farm in Sweden. Neoen also commissioned Finland's largest wind farm, Mutkalampi (404 MW).

Construction of new wind farms have started in 2023, notably in the Nordic countries (Storbotet with a capacity of 105.4 MW and Lumivaara, 55.8 MW), of which respectively 60% and 80% of the energy produced will be sold to Equinix.

In 2024, Neoen finalized the joint financing of the second tranche of the Goyder South Stage 1 wind farm (203 MW). Together with the Blyth Battery (238.5 MW / 477 MWh), these facilities will supply power to the Olympic Dam mine in South Australia, under a baseload electricity supply contract signed with BHP for a capacity of 70 MW.

=== Energy Storage ===
To overcome the intermittency of renewable power sources, Neoen also develops and operates lithium-ion battery projects to store electricity.

At the end of December 2024, Neoen is a leading player in the storage sector, with more than twenty batteries in operation or under construction around the world, with a total capacity of 2.3 GW / 5.3 GWh.

In 2017, Neoen installed the world's first big battery (initially 100 MW / 129MWh, increased to 150 MW/ 193.5 MWh in 2020) built by the American company Tesla, at the Hornsdale Power Reserve in the Mid North region of South Australia to provide grid-support services.

In 2020, Neoen began operating a storage unit in Finland, the largest such battery facility in the Nordic countries. The 30 MW/30 MWh Yllikkälä Power Reserve One is the first large-capacity battery to be connected to the Finnish grid. Since 2022, it has been supplying rapid reserve for the implementation of EPR [AO1] Olkiluoto 3 (Europe's most powerful nuclear reactor), operated by Teollisuuden Voima Oyj (TVO), the Finnish nuclear power operator.

In 2021, Neoen built the Albireo Power Reserve, comprising two 11 MW/8 MWh batteries for the Capella (140 MWp) and Providencia (101 MWp) solar plants. Commissioned in 2022, the assets take Neoen's total capacity in El Salvador to 14 MW, with storage of 10 MWh, making it Central America's number one battery storage operator.

In April 2022, Neoen launched a new virtual battery service, with AGL Energy as its first customer. The virtual battery service will allow major energy consumers and distributors to replicate the functionality of a high-capacity battery without the need to own or build one. Shortly afterwards, in July 2022, Hornsdale Power Reserve became the first large battery in the world to deliver inertia services at scale to the Australian grid.

In late 2022, Neoen began construction on Storen Power Reserve (40 MW / 40 MWh at the time, now 52 MW / 52 MWh), its first battery and second asset in Sweden, as well as in Australia, with Blyth Battery (now 238 MW / 477 MWh) and Western Downs Battery, where capacity is now 270 MW / 540 MWh. In conjunction with Goyder South wind farm, Blyth Battery will provide BHP with a baseload energy supply.

With the start-up of Collie Battery (197 MW/4 hours), its first long-duration battery, in June 2023, Neoen now exceeds 1.1 GW of storage capacity in operation or under construction in Australia.

Expansion in the Nordics continued throughout the winter of 2023/24, with the building of Yllikkälä Power Reserve Two (56.4 MW / 112.9 MWh) in Finland, the largest in the Nordics, and Isbillen Power Reserve (94 MW / 94 MWh), the largest in Sweden.

Confirming its rapid expansion in Canada, Neoen won a 380 MW, 4-hour capacity contract to stabilise Ontario's electricity grid. Tara Battery will have total capacity of 400 MW / 1,600 MWh.

In 2024, Neoen pursued investments in long-duration battery storage with phase 2 of Collie Battery (341 MW / 1,363 MWh), having been awarded a second contract with AEMO. Neoen’s Collie Battery Stage 1 (219 MW / 877 MWh), the largest in Western Australia, began operating ahead of schedule in Q3 and has been providing grid reliability services since October 1 under contract with AEMO.

In late December, Neoen has started construction of the Arneburg Battery (45 MW / 90 MWh), its first asset in Germany. In January 2026, Neoen signed a seven-year tolling agreement with Uniper for 30 MW / 78 MWh of capacity at the Arneburg Battery, with the agreement scheduled to begin in 2027.

In October 2025, Neoen announced the start of construction of Muchea Battery (164 MW / 905 MWh), its first long-duration battery with a 6-hour storage capacity.

== Governance ==
The company is an S.A.S. Corporation, whose main shareholder is Brookfield. Xavier Barbaro is Neoen's founder and he has been leading the company since 2008.

Directors:

- Xavier Barbaro, Group CEO and founder.
- Romain Desrousseaux, Deputy CEO since 2013.
- Norbert Thouvenot, Chief Operating Officer since 2021.
- Olga Kharitonova, General Counsel since 2018.
- Yves-Eric François, Chief Financial Officer since April 2024
- Christophe de Branche, Energy Management Director since March 2024
- Jean-Christophe Cheylus, Regional CEO – Australia
- Guillaume Decaen, Regional CEO – France
- Louis de Sambucy, Regional CEO – Europe (Finland, Germany, Ireland, Italy, Portugal, Sweden)
- Emmanuel Pujol, Regional CEO – Americas

== Shares as at April 4, 2025 ==
Since April 4, 2025, Brookfield has been Neoen's sole shareholder.
