= Heywood interconnector =

Heywood Interconnector
- Map of Heywood Interconnector

Location
- Country: Australia
- State: South Australia and Victoria
- Coordinates: 37.7330°S 140.8410°E
- General direction: East–West
- From: Heywood, Victoria
- Passes through: Mount Gambier, Tailem Bend
- To: Gould Creek, South Australia

Ownership information
- Owner: ElectraNet
- Operator: Australian Energy Market Operator

Construction information
- Commissioned: 1988

Technical information
- Type: overhead transmission line
- Current type: AC
- AC voltage: 275kV

The Heywood interconnector is a 275 kV AC overhead electricity transmission line with two circuits connecting the electricity grids in South Australia and Victoria, two states of Australia. Both are part of the National Electricity Market. The nominal capacity of the interconnector is 650 MW since an upgrade in 2016. The interconnector was commissioned in 1988 and was the first connection between the two state electricity grids.

== Routing ==
The Victorian end of the interconnector is the substation at Heywood. The South Australian end is the South East substation near Mount Gambier. When constructed, the Heywood Interconnector project created the new 275 kV links from South East substation through the Tailem Bend substation to the Para Substation at Gould Creek on the outskirts of Adelaide as Para was the closest 275 kV substation to Heywood at the time. The 2016 upgrade included a new substation named Black Range at Willalooka (halfway between the South East and Tailem Bend substations) with series compensation to improve transmission efficiency.

== Function ==
When the Heywood interconnector was built in 1988, the primary purpose was to move cheaper coal-powered electricity from Victoria to South Australia. In later years, it has been used to an increasing degree to transport wind-powered electricity from South Australia to Victoria.

The 2016 South Australian blackout occurred because multiple windfarms reduced power during a major thunderstorm, after a tornado caused multiple towers on transmission lines to collapse. The Heywood interconnector became overloaded, as the missing generation was automatically drawn from Victoria. The tripping of the interconnector lead to an islanding of the SA power system, which fell into a rapid frequency decline.

Two grid batteries are being built at the South Australia substation, starting at 500 megawatt-hour.
