= Constantin Budeanu =

Romanian electrical engineer

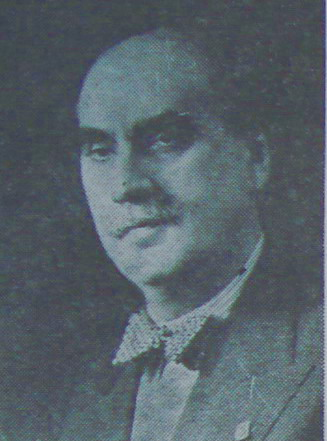
- Born: February 28, 1886; Buzău, Kingdom of Romania
- Died: February 27, 1959 (aged 72); Bucharest, Romanian People's Republic
- Education: Politehnica University of Bucharest
- Occupation: Electrical engineer
- Awards: Order of Labour

Constantin Budeanu (28 February 1886 – 27 February 1959) was a Romanian electrical engineer who contributed to the analysis of electric networks states and the SI system of units.

== Life and work ==
He was born in Buzău. In 1903 he was admitted at the School of Bridges, Roads and Mines, obtaining his engineering diploma in 1909. He then studied electricity in Paris with a V. Adamachi scholarship.

Budeanu proposed the unit electric reactive power (the term var) and he introduced the concept of deformed power in electric networks.

=== Writings ===
- Puissances reactives et fictives 1927
- Sistemul general practic de mărimi și unitati (The General Practical System of Quantities and Units) 1957

== Awards ==
He was awarded the Order of Labour by the communist authorities of Romania.
