= Frede Blaabjerg =

Danish professor at Aalborg University

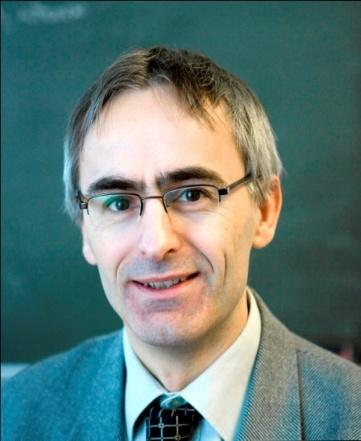
- Blaabjerg in 2014
- Born: May 6, 1963 (age 62); Erslev, Mors, Denmark
- Education: Ph.D., 1995, Aalborg University. Ph.D. thesis: "Modelling Power Electronic Components and Circuits". ISBN 87-89179-10-2 M.Sc.E.E. in System Construction, 1987, Aalborg University Research ID: A-5008-2008 Orcid: http://orcid.org/0000-0001-8311-7412 Google Scholar
- Alma mater: Aalborg University
- Known for: Solar Energy Systems, Electrical Power Production, Transmission/Distribution of Electrical Energy, Efficient use of Electrical Energy
- Scientific career
- Fields: Energy Technology
- Institutions: Pontoppidanstræde 101, Building: 76, 9220 Aalborg Ø DK

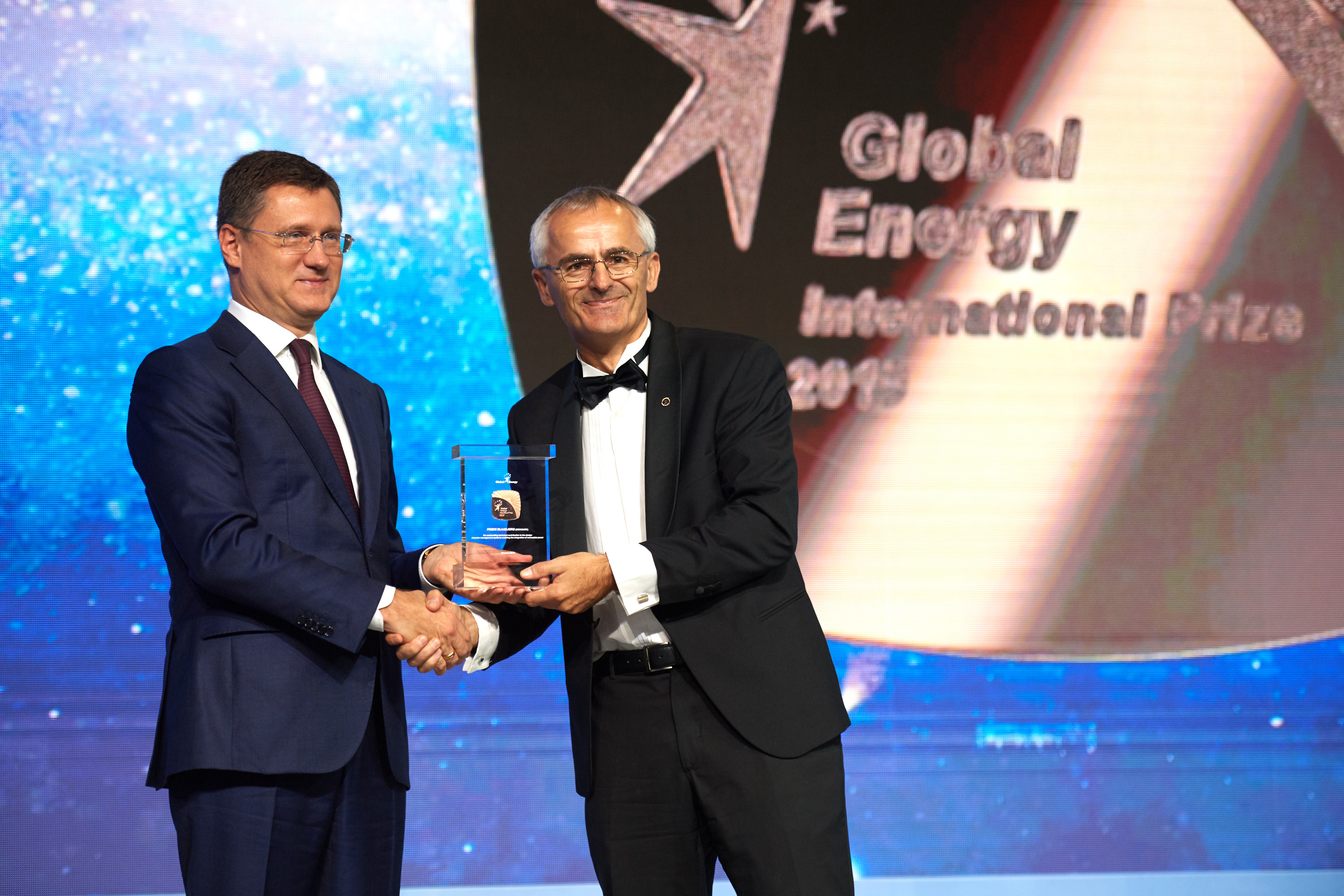
Blaabjerg being awarded the 2019 Global Energy Prize award

Frede Blaabjerg is a Danish professor at Aalborg University. At Aalborg, he works in the section of Power Electronic Systems of the department of Energy Technology. Blaabjerg's research concerns the applications of power electronics, including adjustable-speed drives, microgrids, photovoltaic systems, and wind turbines. By the number of citations, he is the most cited author of several IEEE journals: IEEE Transactions on Power Electronics, IEEE Transactions on Industry Applications, IEEE Journal of Emerging and Selected Topics in Power Electronics.

== Education and career ==
Frede Blaabjerg graduated at Nykøbing Mors Gymnasium in 1982, and in 1987 he became M.Sc. in System construction. From 1987 to 1988 he worked as a project engineer for ASCAN Scandia, Randers. In 1992 to 1996, he was assistant professor at Department of Energy Technology at Aalborg. He received his Ph.D. at Aalborg University in 1995 with the thesis "Modelling Power Electronic Components and Circuits" (ISBN 87-89179-10-2). In 1996–1998, Frede Blaabjerg was an Associate professor until 1998, where he became a full professor in Power Electronics and Drives in the department of Energy Technology at Aalborg University. He had this position until 2006 where he became the Dean of the Faculty of Engineering, Science, and Medicine. In 2010, he returned to his position as Professor in Power Electronics and Drives at Institute of Energy Technology at Aalborg University. Beside his positions at Aalborg University, Frede Blaabjerg is Visiting professor. Currently he is visiting professor at Shandong University, China, 2014-, Harbin University of Technology, China, 2014- , Shanghai Maritime University, China, 2013- and Zhejiang University, China, 2009- . Earlier he had positions as visiting professor at University of Padova, Italy, 2000 and Curtin University of Technology, Perth, Australia, 2002. Frede Blaabjerg was Programme Research Leader of Electrical Design and Control at Research Center Risoe from 2000 to 2002 too. Today he is head of the center of Reliable Power Electronics (Corpe). Additionally, he has taken part in numerous scientific societies/boards such as member of Engitech, Science Europe, 2013- , Member of Strategic Programme Committee Odysseus, Belgium in 2007–2009, Member of the Board of Danish National Advanced Technology Foundation, DK from 2007 to 2014 or Chairman of the Danish Technical Research Council, DK, 2000–2003. Through Frede Blaabjergs career he has supervised more than 70 Ph.D. students and given over 500 national and international lectures. Today most of the lectures are only for special invited, because of the great interest. Frede Blaabjerg has published more than 1400 scientific papers, 380 (800) publications registered in Web of Science (incl. conference-papers), 130 additional papers for journals, 520 conference papers published and presented and four edited books in power electronics. Frede Blaabjerg has had several institutional responsibilities. In 2005 he was Head of the International Doctoral School at Aalborg University and he has been chairman of IEEE EPE'2007 in 2007 with 1000 participants, of the IEEE PEDG'2012 with 250 participants and member of the Board of Morsoe and Aalborghus High Schools from 2007 -.

== Awards ==
- IEEE Edison Medal, 2020
- Global Energy Prize, 2019
- IEEE William E. Newell Power Electronics Award, 2014
- Villum Kann Rasmussen Research Award, 2014
- Fellow, IEEE, 2003
- IEEE Power Electronics Society Distinguished Service Award, 2009
- Grundfos Prize 2004
- "Polish Ministry of Education Award for the Best Books and Monographs" published in the year 2002 (Control in Power Electronics)
- Statoil-Prize 2003
- C.Y. O'Connor Fellowship, 2002, Perth, Australia
- Outstanding Young Power Electronics Engineer Award in 1998 by IEEE Power Electronics Society
- A.R. Angelos Fellowship Award in 1995 for contribution in modulation and drives

== Selected books ==
- M. P. Kazmierkowski, R. Krishnan, & F. Blaabjerg (Eds.). (2002). Control in power electronics: selected problems. M. P. Kazmierkowski, R. Krishnan, & F. Blaabjerg (Eds.). Academic press.
- T. Orłowska-Kowalska, F. Blaabjerg, J. Rodríguez, (Eds.) (2014). Advanced and Intelligent Control in Power Electronics and Drives. Imprint: Springer.
- Henry Shu-hung Chung, Huai Wang, Frede Blaabjerg and Michael Pecht (Eds.) (2015); Reliability of Power Electronic Converter Systems, IET Publisher, ISBN 978-1-84919-901-8
- Yushan Liu, Haitham Abu-Rub, Baoming Ge, Frede Blaabjerg, Omar Ellabban, Poh Chiang Loh; Impedance Source Power Electronic Converters; October 2016, Wiley-IEEE Press; ISBN 978-1-119-03707-1

== Selected publications ==
- M. Forouzesh, Y. P. Siwakoti, S. A. Gorji, F. Blaabjerg and B. Lehman, "Step-Up DC–DC Converters: A Comprehensive Review of Voltage-Boosting Techniques, Topologies, and Applications," in IEEE Transactions on Power Electronics, vol. 32, no. 12, pp. 9143–9178, Dec. 2017.
- O. N. Almasi, V. Fereshtehpoor, M. H. Khooban, and F. Blaabjerg, "Analysis, control and design of a non-inverting buck-boost converter: A bump-less two-level T–S fuzzy PI control," in ISA transactions, vol. 67, pp. 515–527, Mar. 2017.
- K. Ma, N. He, M. Liserre and F. Blaabjerg, "Frequency-Domain Thermal Modeling and Characterization of Power Semiconductor Devices," in IEEE Transactions on Power Electronics, vol. 31, no. 10, pp. 7183–7193, Oct. 2016.
- A. Chub, D. Vinnikov, F. Blaabjerg and F. Z. Peng, "A Review of Galvanically Isolated Impedance-Source DC–DC Converters," in IEEE Transactions on Power Electronics, vol. 31, no. 4, pp. 2808–2828, April 2016.
- X. Wang, Y. W. Li, F. Blaabjerg and P. C. Loh, "Virtual-Impedance-Based Control for Voltage-Source and Current-Source Converters," in IEEE Transactions on Power Electronics, vol. 30, no. 12, pp. 7019–7037, Dec. 2015.
- Y. P. Siwakoti, F. Z. Peng, F. Blaabjerg, P. C. Loh and G. E. Town, "Impedance-Source Networks for Electric Power Conversion Part I: A Topological Review," in IEEE Transactions on Power Electronics, vol. 30, no. 2, pp. 699–716, Feb. 2015.
- N. C. Sintamarean, F. Blaabjerg, H. Wang, F. Iannuzzo, P. De Place Rimmen,"Reliability Oriented Design Tool For the New Generation of Grid Connected PV-Inverters", IEEE Trans. on Power Electronics, Vol. 30, No. 5, 2015, pp. 2635–2644.
- O Ellabban, H Abu-Rub, F Blaabjerg,"Renewable energy resources: Current status, future prospects and their enabling technology" Renewable and Sustainable Energy Reviews, Vol. 39, 2014, pp. 748–764.
- H. Wang, M. Liserre, F. Blaabjerg, P. de Place Rimmen, J. B. Jacobsen, T. Kvisgaard, J. Landkildehus, "Transitioning to Physics-of-Failure as a Reliability Driver in Power Electronics," IEEE Journal of Emerging and Selected Topics in Power Electronics, vol.2, no.1, pp. 97–114, March 2014.
- D. Meneses, F. Blaabjerg, Ó García and J. A. Cobos, "Review and Comparison of Step-Up Transformerless Topologies for Photovoltaic AC-Module Application," in IEEE Transactions on Power Electronics, vol. 28, no. 6, pp. 2649–2663, June 2013
- F. Blaabjerg and K. Ma, "Future on Power Electronics for Wind Turbine Systems," in IEEE Journal of Emerging and Selected Topics in Power Electronics, vol. 1, no. 3, pp. 139–152, Sept. 2013.
- F. Blaabjerg, M. Liserre and K. Ma, "Power Electronics Converters for Wind Turbine Systems," in IEEE Transactions on Industry Applications, vol. 48, no. 2, pp. 708–719, March–April 2012.
- J. Rocabert, A. Luna, F. Blaabjerg, P. Rodríguez, "Control of power converters in AC microgrids", IEEE Trans. on Power Electronics, Vol. 27, No.11, 2012, pp. 4734–4749.
- Z. Chen, J. M. Guerrero and F. Blaabjerg, "A Review of the State of the Art of Power Electronics for Wind Turbines," in IEEE Transactions on Power Electronics, vol. 24, no. 8, pp. 1859–1875, Aug. 2009.
- R. Teodorescu, F. Blaabjerg, M. Liserre, P.C. Loh – "Proportional-Resonant Controllers and Filters for Grid-Connected Voltage Source Converters", IEE Proceedings on Power Applications, Vol. 153, No. 5, Sep. 2006, pp. 750 – 762
- E. Koutroulis, F. Blaabjerg, "Design Optimization of Transformerless Grid-Connected PV Inverters Including Reliability," IEEE Trans. on Power Electronics, vol.28, no.1, pp. 325–335, Jan. 2013
- F. Blaabjerg, R. Teodorescu, M. Liserre, A. V. Timbus, "Overview of Control and Synchronization of Three Phase Distributed Power Generation Systems", IEEE Trans. on Industrial Electronics, Vol. 53, No. 5, 2006, pp. 1398 – 1409.
- M. Liserre, R. Teodorescu and F. Blaabjerg, "Stability of photovoltaic and wind turbine grid-connected inverters for a large set of grid impedance values," in IEEE Transactions on Power Electronics, vol. 21, no. 1, pp. 263–272, Jan. 2006.
- S.B. Kjaer, J.K. Pedersen, F. Blaabjerg, "A review of single-phase grid-connected inverters for photovoltaic modules," IEEE Trans. on Industry Applications, vol.41, no.5, pp. 1292– 1306, Sept.-Oct. 2005.
- M. Liserre, F. Blaabjerg, S. Hansen, "Design and control of an LCL-filter-based three-phase active rectifier," IEEE Trans. on Industry Applications, Vol. 41, No. 5, 2005, pp. 1281–1291.
- F. Blaabjerg, Zhe Chen and S. B. Kjaer, "Power electronics as efficient interface in dispersed power generation systems," in IEEE Transactions on Power Electronics, vol. 19, no. 5, pp. 1184–1194, Sept. 2004.
- C. Klumpner, P. Nielsen, I. Boldea, F. Blaabjerg, "A new matrix converter motor (MCM) for industry applications," IEEE Trans. on Industrial Electronics, vol.49, no.2, pp. 325–335, Apr 2002.
- U. Borup, F. Blaabjerg, P. N. Enjeti, "Sharing of nonlinear load in parallel-connected three-phase converters", IEEE Trans. on Industry Applications, Vol. 37, No. 6, 2001, pp. 1817–1823.
- M. Malinowski, M. P. Kazmierkowski, S. Hansen, F. Blaabjerg and G. D. Marques, "Virtual-flux-based direct power control of three-phase PWM rectifiers," in IEEE Transactions on Industry Applications, vol. 37, no. 4, pp. 1019–1027, Jul/Aug 2001.
- C. Lascu, I. Boldea and F. Blaabjerg, "A modified direct torque control for induction motor sensorless drive," in IEEE Transactions on Industry Applications, vol. 36, no. 1, pp. 122–130, Jan/Feb 2000.
