= Inertial response =

Property of power grids

Inertial response is a property of large synchronous generators, which contain large synchronous rotating masses, and which acts to overcome any immediate imbalance between power supply and demand for electric power systems, typically the electrical grid. Due to the ever existing power imbalance between mechanical power supply and electric power demand the rotational frequency of the rotating masses in all synchronous generators in the grid either speed up and thus absorb the extra power in case of an excess power supply, or slow down and provide additional power in case of an excess power demand. This response in case of a synchronous generator is built-in into the design and happens without any external intervention or coordination, providing the automatic generation control and the grid operator with valuable time (few seconds) to rebalance the system The grid frequency is the combined result of the detailed motions of all individual synchronous rotors in the grid, which are modeled by a general equation of motion called the swing equation.

In the US power systems, the grid operator is mandated to keep the frequency within a tight range, and can be financially responsible if the monitoring by the North American Electric Reliability Corporation detects a non-compliance. Furthermore, in order to protect the equipment, a portion of the load will be disconnected ("underfrequency load shedding", UFLS) if the frequency drops below a limit (59.5 Hz in most of the US, 59.3 Hz in Texas). When an unexpected supply disruption occurs (for example, a generator failure), the primary frequency response kicks in automatically - a sensor detects the lower frequency and adjusts the power of the prime mover accordingly. For a typical synchronous generator, this adjustment involves manipulation of the mechanical devices (valves, etc.) and thus takes time. During this time, the power grid has to rely on the accumulated inertia to slow down the decrease in frequency.

== Synchronous generators ==
Inertia can be measured in power-time product units (say, gigawatt-seconds), but is often normalized to the "size" (nominal electrical power) of the generator and thus can be described in the units of time (so called generator inertia constant). The faster spinning generators might store more kinetic energy (proportional to square of the rotational frequency), but are typically lighter and thus decelerate faster, causing more power to be injected early in the response ("front-loading") when compared to the slower and heavier machines; this is not necessarily better due to interaction between parts of the grid that can cause "bouncing" and instability. Typical power plants have the inertia constant values from 2 seconds (hydropower) to 7 seconds (gas turbines). Since the rotational speed and thus the kinetic energy of a synchronous generator does not depend on its current power level, the inertia of the overall grid (total system inertia, TSI) is related to the inertia constants of the running generators; at the time of lower power demand (say, at night) there might be less generators running, and thus a similar contingency might be harder to deal with.

== Load ==
The electrical load can have an inertia-like quality. For example, typical industrial electrical motors consume less power at lower frequencies, adding a small, but noticeable amount of inertia to the system, this effect is diminishing due to switching to modern and efficient variable-speed controls that have much less inertia-like response.

The ULFS disconnects of the load lower the power demand thus slowing down the decrease in frequency, representing an equivalent to increasing the amount of inertia.

== Variable generation ==
Until the 21st century, conventional inertia in combination with primary frequency response was considered sufficient to reach the target reliability of the US electric grid. High penetration of the variable renewable energy (VRE) created new challenges:

- the wind tends to be higher at night, so the effects of the low demand - and thus smaller amount of synchronous generators online - are exacerbated;
- a VRE generator usually either does not have a rotational mass (solar), or its design does not electromechanically couple it with the rest of the grid. A typical VRE generator is connected to the grid through an inverter (these generators are thus commonly called inverter-based resources) and therefore is unable to contribute the inertia to the system in the same way as the synchronous generator does.

The alternatives to the traditional inertia are therefore applied, and by the 2020s Texas (ERCOT) took the lead in the United States due its higher wind power penetration (almost double that of the Western Interconnection, WI) and its relatively small size that made the contingencies there larger in percentage terms (a single failure can take power equivalent to 6.4% of the average load in comparison to 2.6% for WI and 1.3% for the Eastern Interconnection).

=== Addressing the decline in inertia ===
The following brute-force means are used to keep the grid reliability in the environment of reduced inertia:

- keeping inertia above the threshold levels by forcing the owners of the synchronous generators to operate their units or curtailing the use of grid-following inverter-based resources. From the purely economic standpoint this can only be a temporary measure;
- using less conventional renewable generators that do have inertia (concentrating solar power, biomass power);
- utilizing the rotational mass of synchronous condensers;
- allowing larger frequency deviation than typical 59.5 Hz (Texas allows frequency to drop to 59.3 Hz, an even smaller Quebec Interconnection - to 58.5 Hz);
- fitting non-critical loads that can tolerate brief disconnection (e.g., industrial cooling plants) with automatic relays that shed the load at the preset frequency threshold. In Texas, this was one of the main routes chosen to increase the wind penetration;
- making the customers pay for the frequency response, like other ancillary services, through a market mechanism (an approach also used by ERCOT).

== Fast frequency response ==
Disconnection of the load can be done very quickly (half a second, including the frequency measurement). Inverter-based resources (IBR), if not running at full available power, can also be ramped extremely quickly (25% per second for wind, 100% per second for photovoltaics), limited amount of kinetic energy can be extracted from a wind turbine, providing an extra 10% of its capacity for about half a second (after a half a second delay). Furthermore, the times when a lot of spare IBR capacity is available coincide with the times when the conventional inertia is at its lowest due to many synchronous generators being offline. These benefits of the new technology allow implementation of the fast frequency response (FFR) - frequency control using the dispatch of IBRs and load disconnects to achieve inertia-like reaction times, thus the alternative name for the FFR, synthetic inertia (Eriksson et al. propose to use the term "synthetic inertia" for the units that react proportionally to the rate of change of frequency and reserve the FFR for the units that react to the effects of insufficient inertia, e.g. frequency deviation).

When the grid frequency is too high or too low, active power flow through the high-voltage direct current link will be ramped down or up. In turn, the wind generation will increase or decrease the blade angles to reduce or increase the captured wind power through pitch control.

Grid-scale batteries also can participate in FFR with ramp rate of 100% per second.

== Sources ==
- NERC (May 11, 2021). Balancing and Frequency Control (PDF). North American Electric Reliability Corporation. Archived from the original (PDF) on January 17, 2024.
- Denholm, Paul; Mai, Trieu; Kenyon, Rick Wallace; Kroposki, Ben; O’Malley, Mark (2020). Inertia and the Power Grid: A Guide Without the Spin (PDF). National Renewable Energy Laboratory.
- Eriksson, Robert; Modig, Niklas; Elkington, Katherine (14 November 2017). "Synthetic inertia versus fast frequency response: a definition". IET Renewable Power Generation. 12 (5): 507–514. doi:10.1049/iet-rpg.2017.0370. eISSN 1752-1424. ISSN 1752-1416. S2CID 117501676.
