= Protective relay =

Device to trip a circuit breaker when a fault is detected

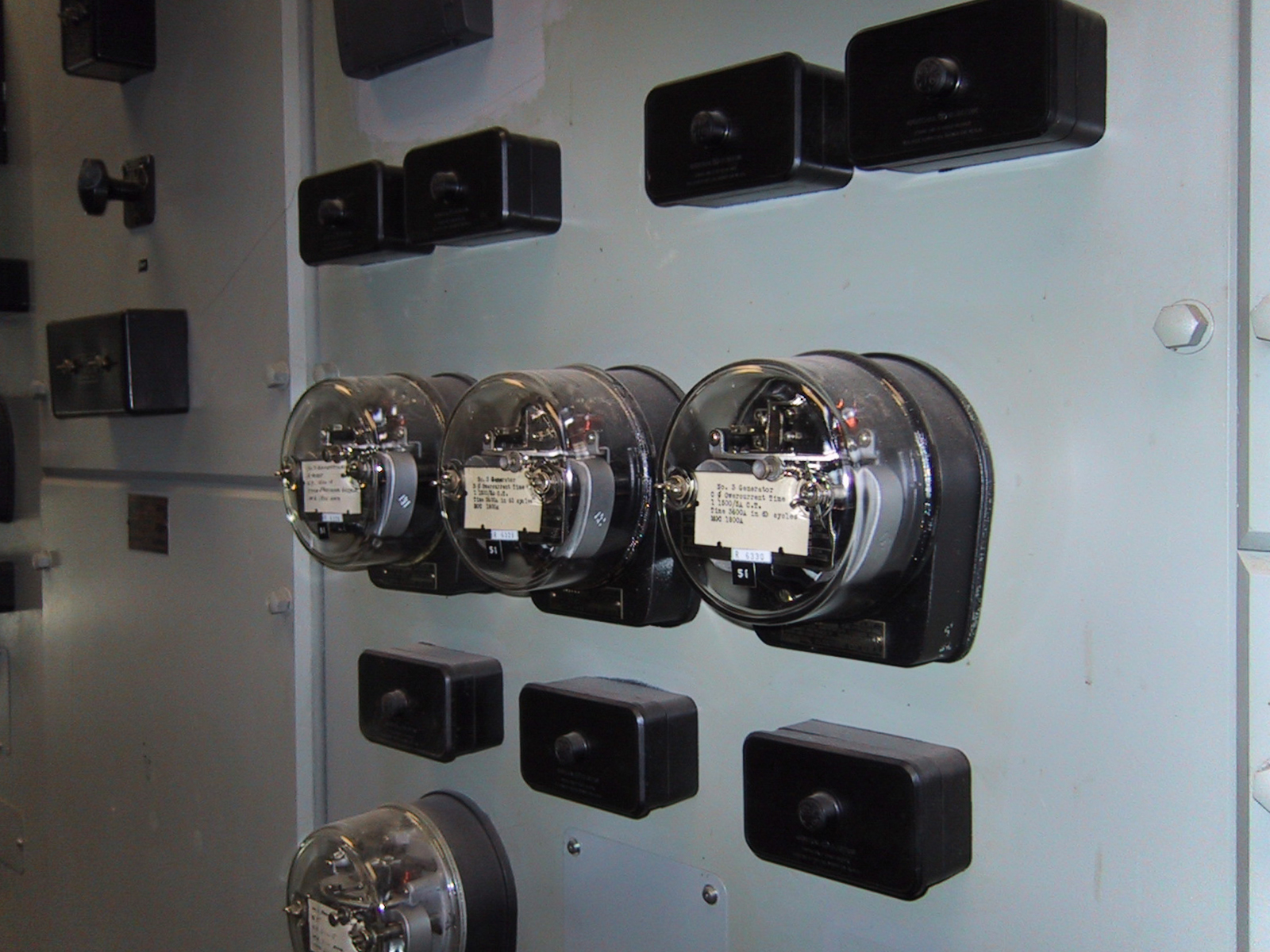
Electromechanical protective relays at a hydroelectric generating plant. The relays are in round glass cases. The rectangular devices are test connection blocks, used for testing and isolation of instrument transformer circuits.

In electrical engineering, a protective relay is a relay device designed to trip a circuit breaker when a fault is detected. The first protective relays were electromagnetic devices, relying on coils operating on moving parts to provide detection of abnormal operating conditions such as over-current, overvoltage, reverse power flow, over-frequency, and under-frequency.

Microprocessor-based solid-state digital protection relays now emulate the original devices, as well as providing types of protection and supervision impractical with electromechanical relays. Electromechanical relays provide only rudimentary indication of the location and origin of a fault. In many cases a single microprocessor relay provides functions that would take two or more electromechanical devices. By combining several functions in one case, numerical relays also save capital cost and maintenance cost over electromechanical relays. However, due to their very long life span, tens of thousands of these "silent sentinels" are still protecting transmission lines and electrical apparatus all over the world. Important transmission lines and generators have cubicles dedicated to protection, with many individual electromechanical devices, or one or two microprocessor relays.

The theory and application of these protective devices is an important part of the education of a power engineer who specializes in power system protection. The need to act quickly to protect circuits and equipment often requires protective relays to respond and trip a breaker within a few thousandths of a second. In some instances these clearance times are prescribed in legislation or operating rules. A maintenance or testing program is used to determine the performance and availability of protection systems.

Based on the end application and applicable legislation, various standards such as ANSI C37.90, IEC255-4, IEC60255-3, and IAC govern the response time of the relay to the fault conditions that may occur.

== Operation principles ==
Electromechanical protective relays operate by either magnetic attraction, or magnetic induction. Unlike switching type electromechanical relays with fixed and usually ill-defined operating voltage thresholds and operating times, protective relays have well-established, selectable, and adjustable time and current (or other operating parameter) operating characteristics. Protection relays may use arrays of induction disks, shaded-pole, magnets, operating and restraint coils, solenoid-type operators, telephone-relay contacts, and phase-shifting networks.

Protective relays can also be classified by the type of measurement they make. A protective relay may respond to the magnitude of a quantity such as voltage or current. Induction relays can respond to the product of two quantities in two field coils, which could for example represent the power in a circuit.

"It is not practical to make a relay that develops a torque equal to the quotient of two a.c. quantities. This, however is not important; the only significant condition for a relay is its setting and the setting can be made to correspond to a ratio regardless of the component values over a wide range."

Several operating coils can be used to provide "bias" to the relay, allowing the sensitivity of response in one circuit to be controlled by another. Various combinations of "operate torque" and "restraint torque" can be produced in the relay.

By use of a permanent magnet in the magnetic circuit, a relay can be made to respond to current in one direction differently from in another. Such polarized relays are used on direct-current circuits to detect, for example, reverse current into a generator. These relays can be made bistable, maintaining a contact closed with no coil current and requiring reverse current to reset. For AC circuits, the principle is extended with a polarizing winding connected to a reference voltage source.

Lightweight contacts make for sensitive relays that operate quickly, but small contacts can't carry or break heavy currents. Often the measuring relay will trigger auxiliary telephone-type armature relays.

In a large installation of electromechanical relays, it would be difficult to determine which device originated the signal that tripped the circuit. This information is useful to operating personnel to determine the likely cause of the fault and to prevent its re-occurrence. Relays may be fitted with a "target" or "flag" unit, which is released when the relay operates, to display a distinctive colored signal when the relay has tripped.

== Types according to construction ==
=== Electromechanical ===
Electromechanical relays can be classified into several different types as follows:

- attracted armature
- moving coil
- induction
- motor operated
- mechanical
- thermal

"Armature"-type relays have a pivoted lever supported on a hinge or knife-edge pivot, which carries a moving contact. These relays may work on either alternating or direct current, but for alternating current, a shading coil on the pole is used to maintain contact force throughout the alternating current cycle. Because the air gap between the fixed coil and the moving armature becomes much smaller when the relay has operated, the current required to maintain the relay closed is much smaller than the current to first operate it. The "returning ratio" or "differential" is the measure of how much the current must be reduced to reset the relay.

A variant application of the attraction principle is the plunger-type or solenoid operator. A reed relay is another example of the attraction principle.

"Moving coil" meters use a loop of wire turns in a stationary magnet, similar to a galvanometer but with a contact lever instead of a pointer. These can be made with very high sensitivity. Another type of moving coil suspends the coil from two conductive ligaments, allowing very long travel of the coil.

=== Induction disc overcurrent relay ===
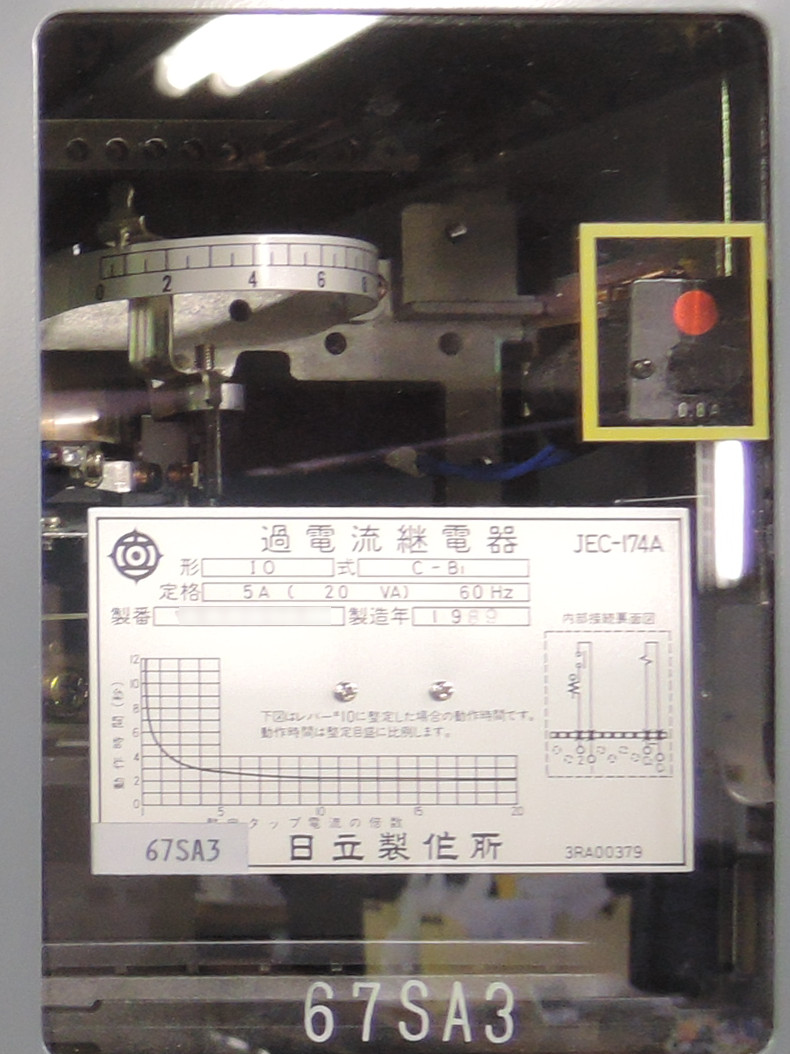
When the input current is above the current limit, the disk rotates, the contact moves left and reaches the fixed contact. The scale above the plate indicates the delay-time.

"Induction" disk meters work by inducing currents in a disk that is free to rotate; the rotary motion of the disk operates a contact. Induction relays require alternating current; if two or more coils are used, they must be at the same frequency otherwise no net operating force is produced. These electromagnetic relays use the induction principle discovered by Galileo Ferraris in the late 19th century. The magnetic system in induction disc overcurrent relays is designed to detect overcurrents in a power system and operate with a pre-determined time delay when certain overcurrent limits have been reached. In order to operate, the magnetic system in the relays produces torque that acts on a metal disc to make contact, according to the following basic current/torque equation:

$T \propto \phi_s \times \phi_u \sin \alpha$

Where $\phi_u$ and $\phi_s$ are the two fluxes and $\alpha$ is the phase angle between the fluxes

The following important conclusions can be drawn from the above equation.

- Two alternating fluxes with a phase shift are needed for torque production.
- Maximum torque is produced when the two alternating fluxes are 90 degrees apart.
- The resultant torque is steady and not a function of time.

The relay's primary winding is supplied from the power systems current transformer via a plug bridge, which is called the plug setting multiplier (psm). Usually seven equally spaced tappings or operating bands determine the relays sensitivity. The primary winding is located on the upper electromagnet. The secondary winding has connections on the upper electromagnet that are energised from the primary winding and connected to the lower electromagnet. Once the upper and lower electromagnets are energised they produce eddy currents that are induced onto the metal disc and flow through the flux paths. This relationship of eddy currents and fluxes creates torque proportional to the input current of the primary winding, due to the two flux paths being out of phase by 90°.

In an overcurrent condition, a value of current will be reached that overcomes the control spring pressure on the spindle and the braking magnet, causing the metal disc to rotate towards the fixed contact. This initial movement of the disc is also held off to a critical positive value of current by small slots that are often cut into the side of the disc. The time taken for rotation to make the contacts is not only dependent on current but also the spindle backstop position, known as the time multiplier (tm). The time multiplier is divided into 10 linear divisions of the full rotation time.

Providing the relay is free from dirt, the metal disc and the spindle with its contact will reach the fixed contact, thus sending a signal to trip and isolate the circuit, within its designed time and current specifications. Drop off current of the relay is much lower than its operating value, and once reached the relay will be reset in a reverse motion by the pressure of the control spring governed by the braking magnet.

=== Static ===
Application of electronic amplifiers to protective relays was described as early as 1928, using vacuum tube amplifiers and continued up to 1956. Devices using electron tubes were studied but never applied as commercial products, because of the limitations of vacuum tube amplifiers. A relatively large standby current is required to maintain the tube filament temperature; inconvenient high voltages are required for the circuits, and vacuum tube amplifiers had difficulty with incorrect operation due to noise disturbances.

Static relays have no or few moving parts, and became practical with the introduction of the transistor. Measuring elements of static relays have been successfully and economically built up from diodes, zener diodes, avalanche diodes, unijunction transistors, p-n-p and n-p-n bipolar transistors, field effect transistors or their combinations. Static relays offer the advantage of higher sensitivity than purely electromechanical relays, because power to operate output contacts is derived from a separate supply, not from the signal circuits. Static relays eliminated or reduced contact bounce, and could provide fast operation, long life and low maintenance.

=== Digital ===
Digital protective relays were in their infancy during the late 1960s. An experimental digital protection system was tested in the lab and in the field in the early 1970s. Unlike the relays mentioned above, digital protective relays have two main parts: hardware and software. The world's first commercially available digital protective relay was introduced to the power industry in 1984 by Schweitzer Engineering Laboratories (SEL) based in Pullman, Washington. In spite of the developments of complex algorithms for implementing protection functions the microprocessor based-relays marketed in the 1980s did not incorporate them. A microprocessor-based digital protection relay can replace the functions of many discrete electromechanical instruments. These relays convert voltage and currents to digital form and process the resulting measurements using a microprocessor. The digital relay can emulate functions of many discrete electromechanical relays in one device, simplifying protection design and maintenance. Each digital relay can run self-test routines to confirm its readiness and alarm if a fault is detected. Digital relays can also provide functions such as communications (SCADA) interface, monitoring of contact inputs, metering, waveform analysis, and other useful features. Digital relays can, for example, store multiple sets of protection parameters, which allows the behavior of the relay to be changed during maintenance of attached equipment. Digital relays also can provide protection strategies impossible to implement with electromechanical relays. This is particularly so in long-distance high voltage or multi-terminal circuits or in lines that are series or shunt compensated They also offer benefits in self-testing and communication to supervisory control systems.

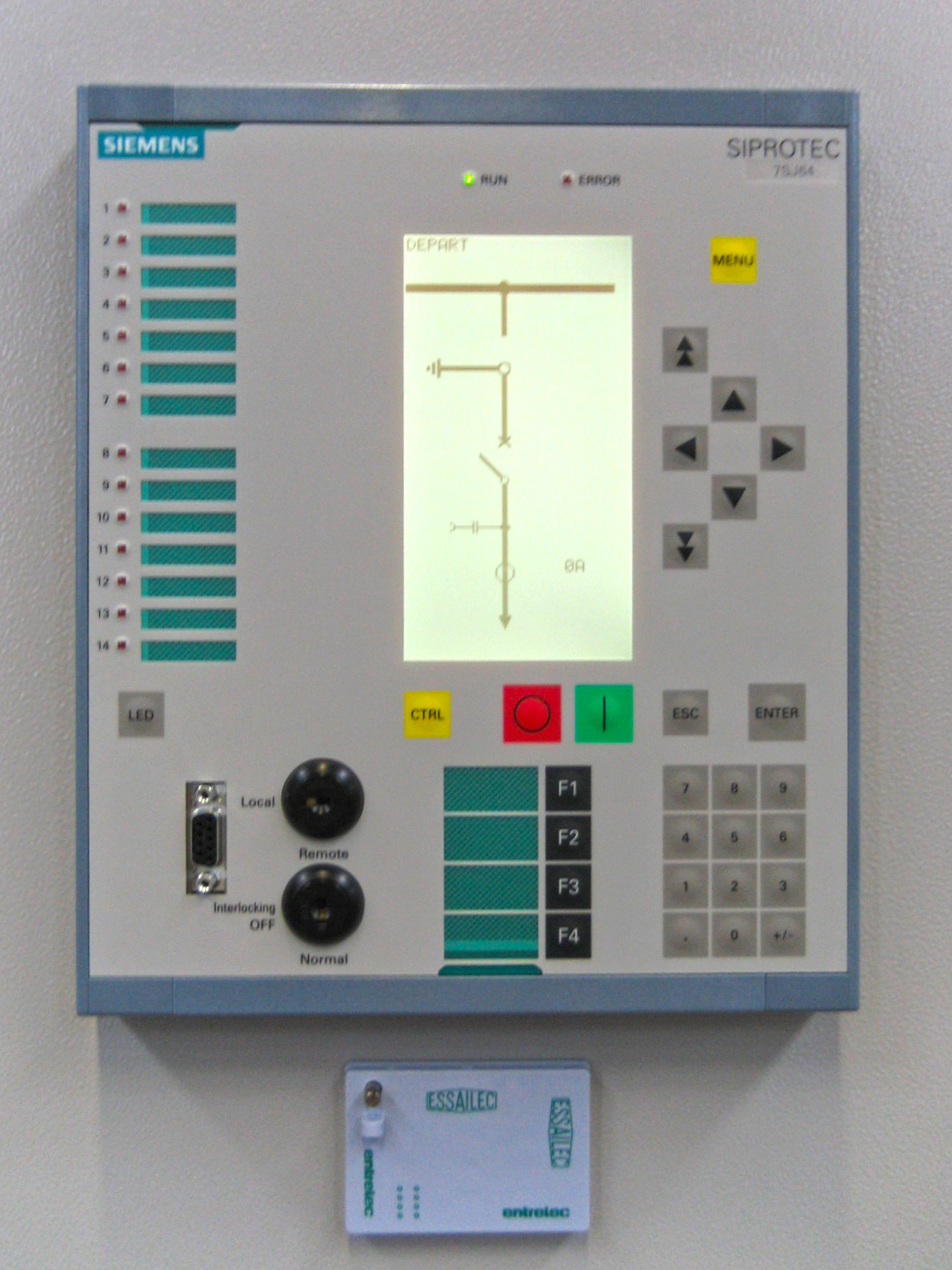
A digital (numeric) multifunction protective relay for distribution networks. A single such device can replace many single-function electromechanical relays, and provides self-testing and communication functions.

=== Numerical ===
The distinction between digital and numerical protection relay rests on points of fine technical detail, and is rarely found in areas other than Protection. Numerical relays are the product of the advances in technology from digital relays. Generally, there are several different types of numerical protection relays. Each type, however, shares a similar architecture, thus enabling designers to build an entire system solution that is based on a relatively small number of flexible components. They use high speed processors executing appropriate algorithms. Most numerical relays are also multifunctional and have multiple setting groups each often with tens or hundreds of settings.

== Relays by functions ==
The various protective functions available on a given relay are denoted by standard ANSI device numbers. For example, a relay including function 51 would be a timed overcurrent protective relay.

=== Overcurrent relay ===
An overcurrent relay is a type of protective relay which operates when the load current exceeds a pickup value. It is of two types: instantaneous over current (IOC) relay and definite time overcurrent (DTOC) relay.

The ANSI device number is 50 for an IOC relay or a DTOC relay. In a typical application, the over current relay is connected to a current transformer and calibrated to operate at or above a specific current level. When the relay operates, one or more contacts will operate and energize to trip a circuit breaker. The DTOC relay has been used extensively in the United Kingdom but its inherent issue of operating slower for faults closer to the source led to the development of the IDMT relay.

A definite time over-current (DTOC) relay is a relay that operates after a definite period of time once the current exceeds the pickup value. Hence, this relay has current setting range as well as time setting range.

An instantaneous over-current relay is an overcurrent relay which has no intentional time delay for operation. The contacts of the relay are closed instantly when the current inside the relay rises beyond the operational value. The time interval between the instant pick-up value and the closing contacts of the relay is very low. It has low operating time and starts operating instantly when the value of current is more than the relay setting. This relay operates only when the impedance between the source and the relay is less than that provided in the section.

An inverse-time over-current (ITOC) relay is an overcurrent relay which operates only when the magnitude of their operating current is inversely proportional to the magnitude of the energize quantities. The operating time of relay decreases with the increases in the current. The operation of the relay depends on the magnitude of the current.

An inverse definite minimum time (IDMT) relay is a protective relay which is developed to overcome the shortcomings of the definite time overcurrent (DTOC) relays.

If the source impedance remains constant and the fault current changes appreciably as we move away from the relay then it is advantageous to use IDMT overcurrent protection to achieve high speed protection over a large section of the protected circuit. However, if the source impedance is significantly larger than the feeder impedance then the characteristic of the IDMT relay cannot be exploited and DTOC may be utilized. Secondly if the source impedance varies and becomes weaker with less generation during light loads then this leads to slower clearance time hence negating the purpose of the IDMT relay.

IEC standard 60255-151 specifies the IDMT relay curves as shown below. The four curves in Table 1 are derived from the now withdrawn British Standard BS 142. The other five, in Table 2, are derived from the ANSI standard C37.112.

While it is more common to use IDMT relays for current protection it is possible to utilize IDMT mode of operation for voltage protection. It is possible to program customised curves in some protective relays and other manufacturers have special curves specific to their relays. Some numerical relays can be used to provide inverse time overvoltage protection or negative sequence overcurrent protection.

Table 1. Curves derived from BS 142
Relay Characteristic	IEC Equation
Standard Inverse (SI)	$t=TMS\times\frac{0.14}{I_r^{0.02}-1}$
Very Inverse	$t=TMS\times\frac{13.5}{I_r-1}$
Extremely Inverse (EI)	$t=TMS\times\frac{80}{I_r^{2}-1}$
Long time standard earth fault	$t=TMS\times\frac{120}{I_r-1}$

Table 2. Curves derives from ANSI standard (North American IDMT relay characteristics)
Relay Characteristic	IEEE Equation
IEEE Moderately Inverse	$t=\frac{TD}{7}\biggl\{\biggl( \frac{0.0515}{I_r^{0.02}-1}\biggl)+0.114\biggl\}$
IEE Very Inverse (VI)	$t=\frac{TD}{7}\biggl\{\biggl( \frac{19.61}{I_r^{2}-1}\biggl)+0.491\biggl\}$
Extremely Inverse (EI)	$t=\frac{TD}{7}\biggl\{\biggl( \frac{28.2}{I_r^{2}-1}\biggl)+0.1217\biggl\}$
US CO_{8} inverse	$t=\frac{TD}{7}\biggl\{\biggl( \frac{5.95}{I_r^{2}-1}\biggl)+0.18\biggl\}$
US CO_{2} Short Time inverse	$t=\frac{TD}{7}\biggl\{\biggl( \frac{0.02394} {I_r^{0.02}-1}\biggl)+0.01694\biggl\}$

I_{r} = is the ratio of the fault current to the relay setting current or a Plug Setting Multiplier. "Plug" is a reference from the electromechanical relay era and were available in discrete steps. TD is the Time Dial setting.

$PSM= \frac{Primary \ fault \ current}{Relay \ current \ setting \ \times \ CT \ ratio}$

The above equations result in a "family" of curves as a result of using different time multiplier setting (TMS) settings. It is evident from the relay characteristic equations that a larger TMS will result in a slower clearance time for a given PMS (I_{r}) value.

=== Distance relay ===
Distance relays, also known as impedance relay, differ in principle from other forms of protection in that their performance is not governed by the magnitude of the current or voltage in the protected circuit but rather on the ratio of these two quantities. Distance relays are actually double actuating quantity relays with one coil energized by voltage and other coil by current. The current element produces a positive or pick up torque while the voltage element produces a negative or reset torque. The relay operates only when the V/I ratio falls below a predetermined value (or set value). During a fault on the transmission line the fault current increases and the voltage at the fault point decreases. The V/I ratio is measured at the location of CTs and PTs. The voltage at the PT location depends on the distance between the PT and the fault. If the measured voltage is lesser, that means the fault is nearer and vice versa. Hence the protection called Distance relay. The load flowing through the line appears as an impedance to the relay and sufficiently large loads (as impedance is inversely proportional to the load) can lead to a trip of the relay even in the absence of a fault.

=== Current differential protection scheme ===
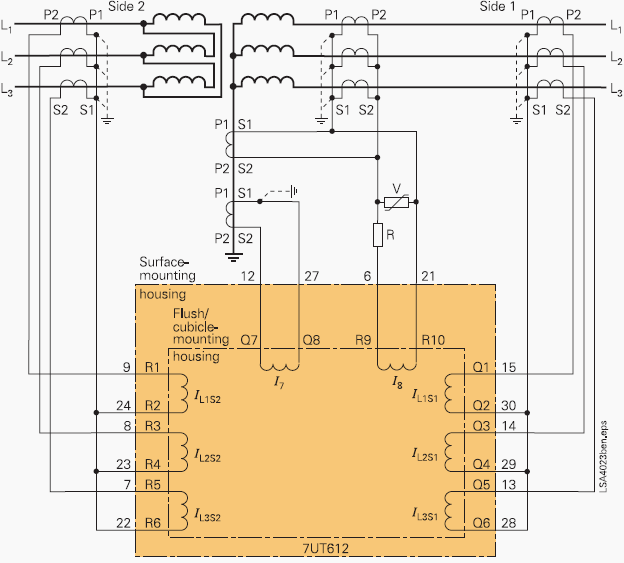

A differential scheme acts on the difference between current entering a protected zone (which may be a bus bar, generator, transformer or other apparatus) and the current leaving that zone. A fault outside the zone gives the same fault current at the entry and exit of the zone, but faults within the zone show up as a difference in current.

"The differential protection is 100% selective and therefore only responds to faults within its protected zone. The boundary of the protected zone is uniquely defined by the location of the current transformers. Time grading with other protection systems is therefore not required, allowing for tripping without additional delay. Differential protection is therefore suited as fast main protection for all important plant items."

Differential protection can be used to provide protection for zones with multiple terminals and can be used to protect lines, generators, motors, transformers, and other electrical plant.

=== Directional relay ===
A directional relay uses an additional polarizing source of voltage or current to determine the direction of a fault. Directional elements respond to the phase shift between a polarizing quantity and an operate quantity. The fault can be located upstream or downstream of the relay's location, allowing appropriate protective devices to be operated inside or outside of the zone of protection.

=== Synchronism check ===
A synchronism checking relay provides a contact closure when the frequency and phase of two sources are similar to within some tolerance margin. A "synch check" relay is often applied where two power systems are interconnected, such as at a switchyard connecting two power grids, or at a generator circuit breaker to ensure the generator is synchronized to the system before connecting it.

== Power source ==
Relays can also be classified by their type of power source.

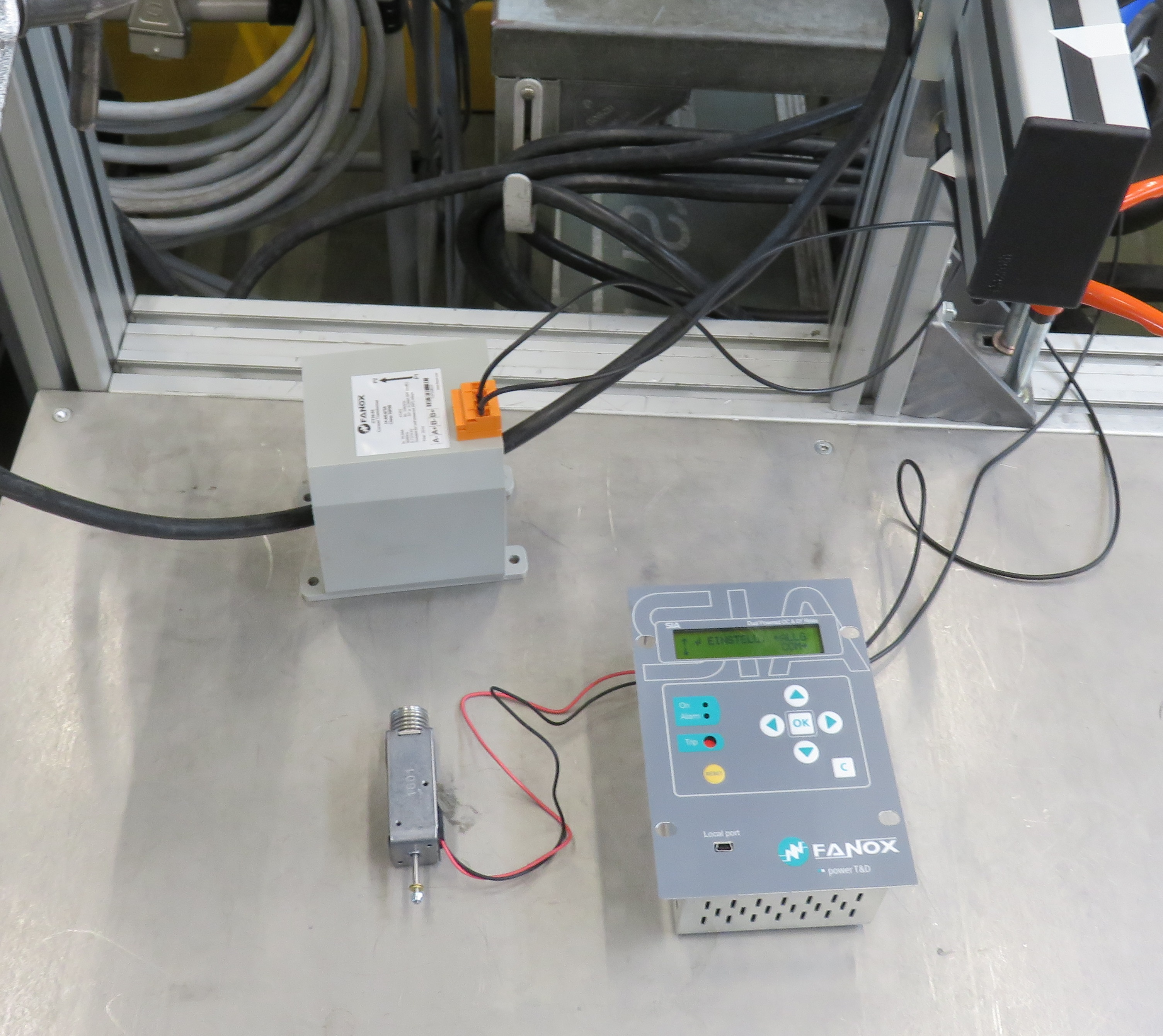
A dual powered protection relay powered by the current obtained from the line by a CT. The striker is also shown

- Self-powered relays operate on energy derived from the protected circuit, such as through the current transformers used to measure line current. Self-powered relays are advantageous in terms of cost and reliability as they do not require a separate power supply.
- Auxiliary-powered relays rely on a battery or external AC supply. Some relays can use either AC or DC. The auxiliary supply must be highly reliable during a system fault to ensure the relay can operate.
- Dual-powered relays are powered by the protected circuit and through an auxiliary power source which acts as a backup.

== Sources ==
- Anderson, Paul M. (1998-12-09). "A. Protection terminology". Power System Protection (PDF). New York: Wiley-IEEE Press. pp. 1249–1258. ISBN 0-7803-3427-2.
