= Numerical relay =

System using algorithmic detection of electrical faults

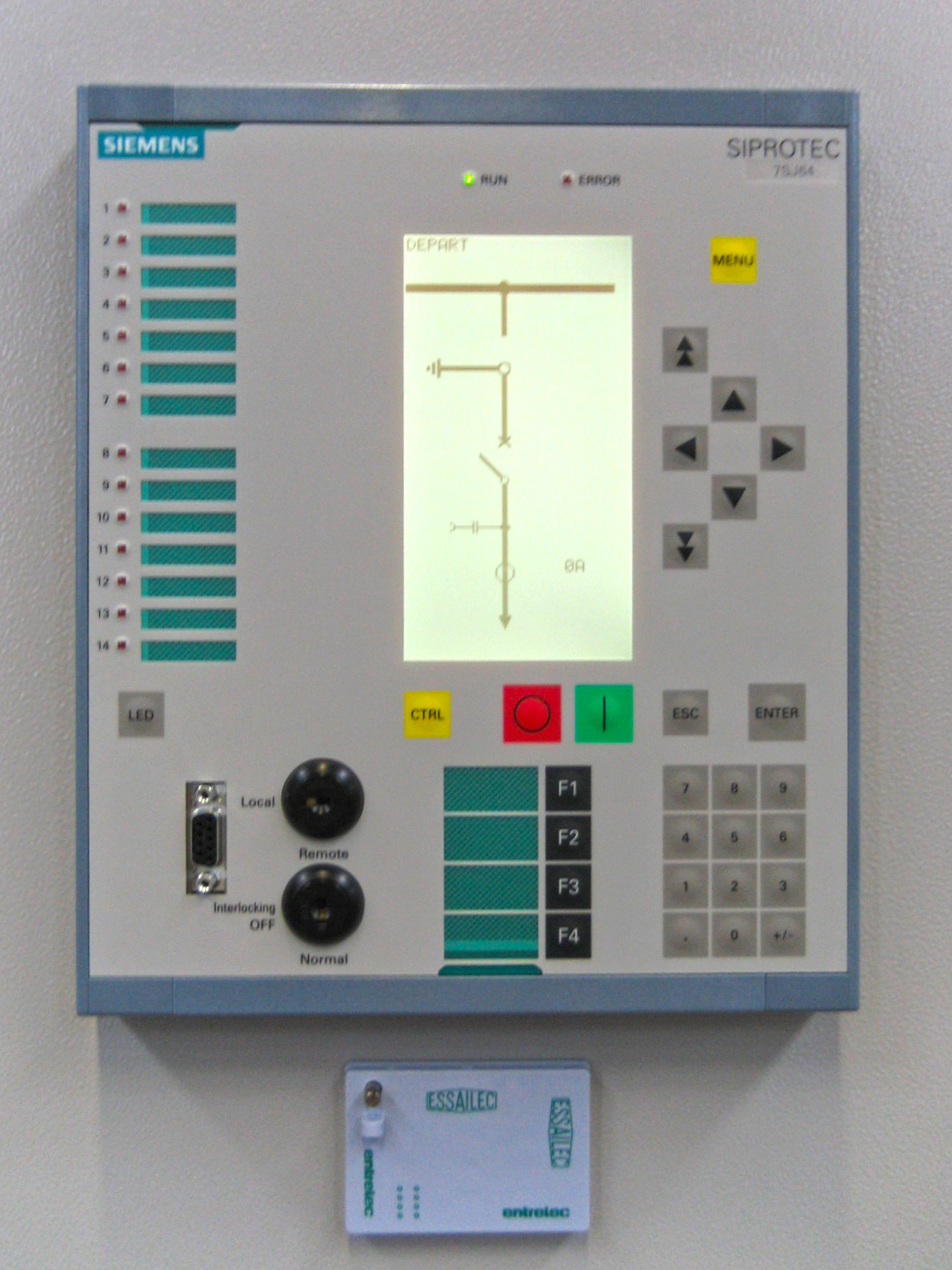
Protective relay

In utility and industrial electric power transmission and distribution systems, a numerical relay is a computer-based system with software-based protection algorithms for the detection of electrical faults. Such relays are also termed as microprocessor type protective relays. They are functional replacements for electro-mechanical protective relays and may include many protection functions in one unit, as well as providing metering, communication, and self-test functions.

== Description and definition ==
The digital protective relay is a protective relay that uses a microprocessor to analyze power system voltages, currents or other process quantities for the purpose of detection of faults in an electric power system or industrial process system. A digital protective relay may also be called a "numeric protective relay".

=== Input processing ===
Low voltage and low current signals (i.e., at the secondary of a voltage transformers and current transformers) are brought into a low-pass filter that removes frequency content above about 1/3 of the sampling frequency (a relay A/D converter needs to sample faster than twice per cycle of the highest frequency that it is to monitor). The AC signal is then sampled by the relay's analog-to-digital converter from 4 to 64 (varies by relay) samples per power system cycle. As a minimum, magnitude of the incoming quantity, commonly using Fourier transform concepts (RMS and some form of averaging) would be used in a simple relay function. More advanced analysis can be used to determine phase angles, power, reactive power, impedance, waveform distortion, and other complex quantities.

Only the fundamental component is needed for most protection algorithms, unless a high speed algorithm is used that uses subcycle data to monitor for fast changing issues. The sampled data is then passed through a low-pass filter that numerically removes the frequency content that is above the fundamental frequency of interest (i.e., nominal system frequency), and uses Fourier transform algorithms to extract the fundamental frequency magnitude and angle.

=== Logic processing ===
The relay analyzes the resultant A/D converter outputs to determine if action is required under its protection algorithm(s). Protection algorithms are a set of logic equations in part designed by the protection engineer, and in part designed by the relay manufacturer. The relay is capable of applying advanced logic. It is capable of analyzing whether the relay should trip or restrain from tripping based on parameters set by the user, compared against many functions of its analogue inputs, relay contact inputs, timing and order of event sequences.

If a fault condition is detected, output contacts operate to trip the associated circuit breaker(s).

=== Parameter setting ===
The logic is user-configurable and can vary from simply changing front panel switches or moving of circuit board jumpers to accessing the relay's internal parameter setting webpage via communications link on another computer hundreds of kilometers away.

The relay may have an extensive collection of settings, beyond what can be entered via front panel knobs and dials, and these settings are transferred to the relay via an interface with a PC (personal computer), and this same PC interface may be used to collect event reports from the relay.

=== Event recording ===
In some relays, a short history of the entire sampled data is kept for oscillographic records. The event recording would include some means for the user to see the timing of key logic decisions, relay I/O (input/output) changes, and see, in an oscillographic fashion, at least the fundamental component of the incoming analogue parameters.

=== Data display ===
Digital/numerical relays provide a front panel display, or display on a terminal through a communication interface. This is used to display relay settings and real-time current/voltage values, etc.

More complex digital relays will have metering and communication protocol ports, allowing the relay to become an element in a SCADA system. Communication ports may include RS-232/RS-485 or Ethernet (copper or fibre-optic). Communication languages may include Modbus, DNP3 or IEC61850 protocols.

== Comparison with other types ==
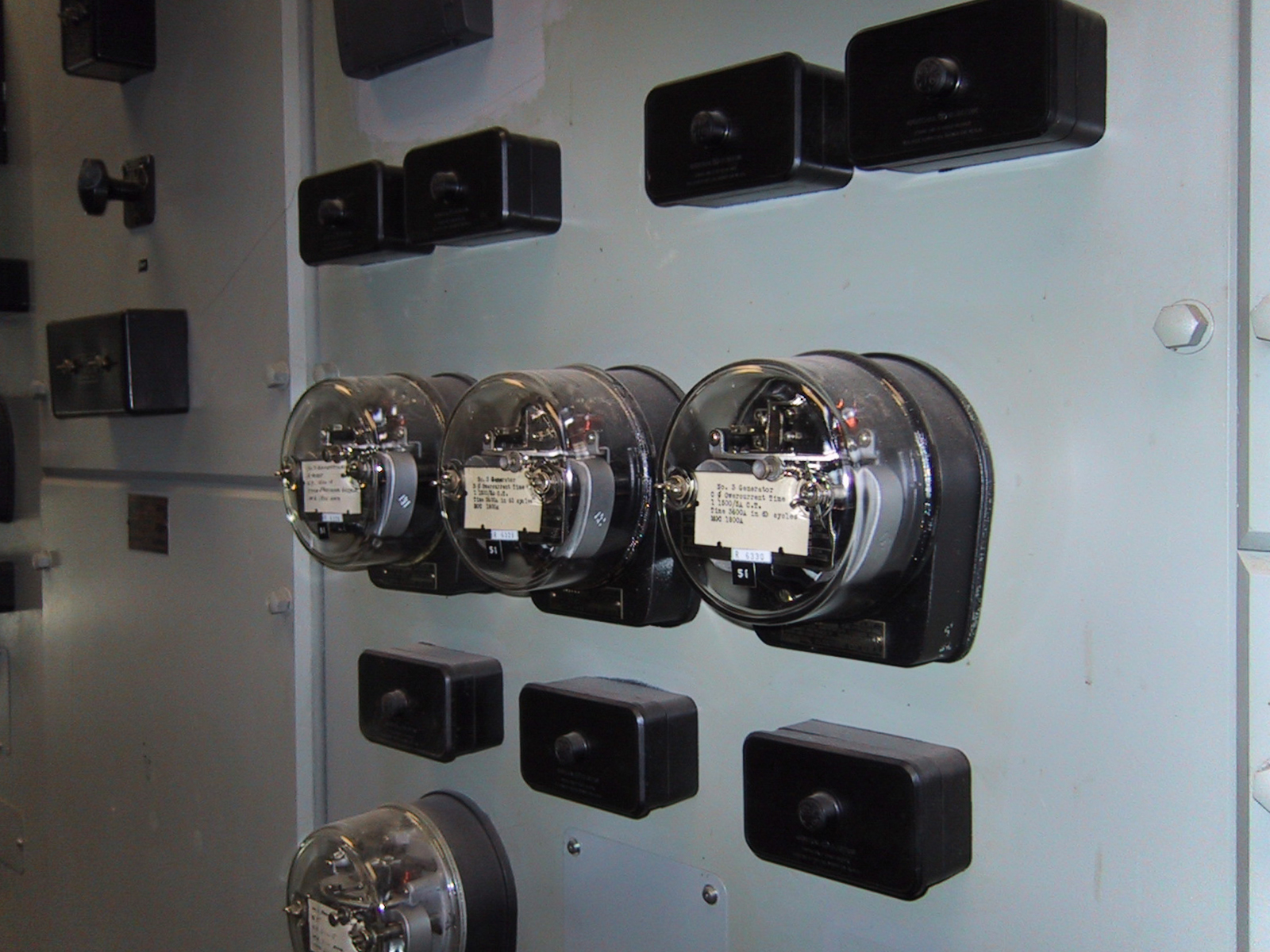
Electromechanical protective relays at a hydroelectric generation station

By contrast, an electromechanical protective relay converts the voltages and currents to magnetic and electric forces and torques that press against spring tensions in the relay. The tension of the spring and taps on the electromagnetic coils in the relay are the main processes by which a user sets such a relay.

In a solid-state relay, the incoming voltage and current wave-forms are monitored by analog circuits, not recorded or digitized. The analog values are compared to settings made by the user via potentiometers in the relay, and in some case, taps on transformers.

In some solid-state relays, a simple microprocessor does some of the relay logic, but the logic is fixed and simple. For instance, in some time overcurrent solid state relays, the incoming AC current is first converted into a small signal AC value, then the AC is fed into a rectifier and filter that converts the AC to a DC value proportionate to the AC waveform. An op-amp and comparator is used to create a DC that rises when a trip point is reached. Then a relatively simple microprocessor does a slow speed A/D conversion of the DC signal, integrates the results to create the time-overcurrent curve response, and trips when the integration rises above a set-point. Though this relay has a microprocessor, it lacks the attributes of a digital/numeric relay, and hence the term "microprocessor relay" is not a clear term.

== History ==
The digital/numeric relay was invented by George Rockefeller. George conceived of it in his Master's Thesis in 1967–68 at Newark College of Engineering. He published his seminal paper Fault Protection with a Digital Computer in 1969. Westinghouse developed the first digital relay with the Prodar 70 being developed between 1969 and 1971. It was commissioned in service on a 230kV transmission line at PG&E's Tesla substation in February 1971 and was in service for six years. In 2017, George received the IEEE Halperin Electric Transmission and Distribution Award. The award was for "pioneering development and practical demonstration of protective relaying of electric power systems with real-time digital computer techniques." George was chairman of the IEEE Power System Relaying and Control (PSRC) committee (1981-1982) as well as a member of the "Computer Relaying Subcommittee" which was created by the PSRC in 1971 and disbanded in 1978. He wrote the foreword for the PSRC tutorial on Computer Relaying produced in 1979.

In 1971 M. Ramamoorty was the first to describe calculation of impedance for distance protection using discrete Fourier analysis.

The first practical commercially available microprocessor based digital/numeric relay was made by Edmund O. Schweitzer, III in the early 1980s. SEL, AREVA, and ABB Group's were early forerunners making some of the early market advances in the arena, but the arena has become crowded today with many manufacturers. In transmission line and generator protection, by the mid-1990s the digital relay had nearly replaced the solid state and electro-mechanical relay in new construction. In distribution applications, the replacement by the digital relay proceeded a bit more slowly. While the great majority of feeder relays in new applications today are digital, the solid state relay still sees some use where simplicity of the application allows for simpler relays, which allows one to avoid the complexity of digital relays.

== Protective element types ==
Protective elements refer to the overall logic surrounding the electrical condition that is being monitored. For instance, a differential element refers to the logic required to monitor two (or more) currents, find their difference, and trip if the difference is beyond certain parameters. The term element and function are quite interchangeable in many instances.

For simplicity on one-line diagrams, the protection function is usually identified by an ANSI device number. In the era of electromechanical and solid state relays, any one relay could implement only one or two protective functions, so a complete protection system may have many relays on its panel. In a digital/numeric relay, many functions are implemented by the microprocessor programming. Any one numeric relay may implement one or all of these functions.

A listing of device numbers is found at ANSI Device Numbers. A summary of some common device numbers seen in digital relays is:

- 11 – Multi-function Device
- 21 – Distance
- 24 – Volts/Hz
- 25 – Synchronizing
- 27 – Under Voltage
- 32 – Directional Power Element
- 46 – Negative Sequence Current
- 40 – Loss of Excitation
- 47 – Negative Sequence Voltage
- 50 – Instantaneous Overcurrent (N for neutral, G for ground current)
- 51 – Inverse Time Overcurrent (N for neutral, G from ground current)
- 59 – Over Voltage
- 62 – Timer
- 64 – Ground Fault (64F = Field Ground, 64G = Generator Ground)
- 67 – Directional Over Current (typically controls a 50/51 element)
- 79 – Reclosing Relay
- 81 – Under/Over Frequency
- 86 – Lockout Relay / Trip Circuit Supervision
- 87 – Current Differential (87L=transmission line diff; 87T=transformer diff; 87G=generator diff)

== See also ==
- Polyphase system
- Overhead power line
- Power outage
- Three-phase electric power
