= HIZ =

HIZ, Hiz, or hi-Z may refer to:

- River Hiz, river in England
- Hi-Z, a name for high impedance in digital electronics
- Home Ignition Zone, risk of a structure to ignite in a wildfire used in wildland–urban interface
- HIZ, division code for Haizhou, Lianyungang, China
- HIZ, ANSI device number code for High Impedance Fault Detector
