= Induction disk motor =

Low-power, low-speed AC motor

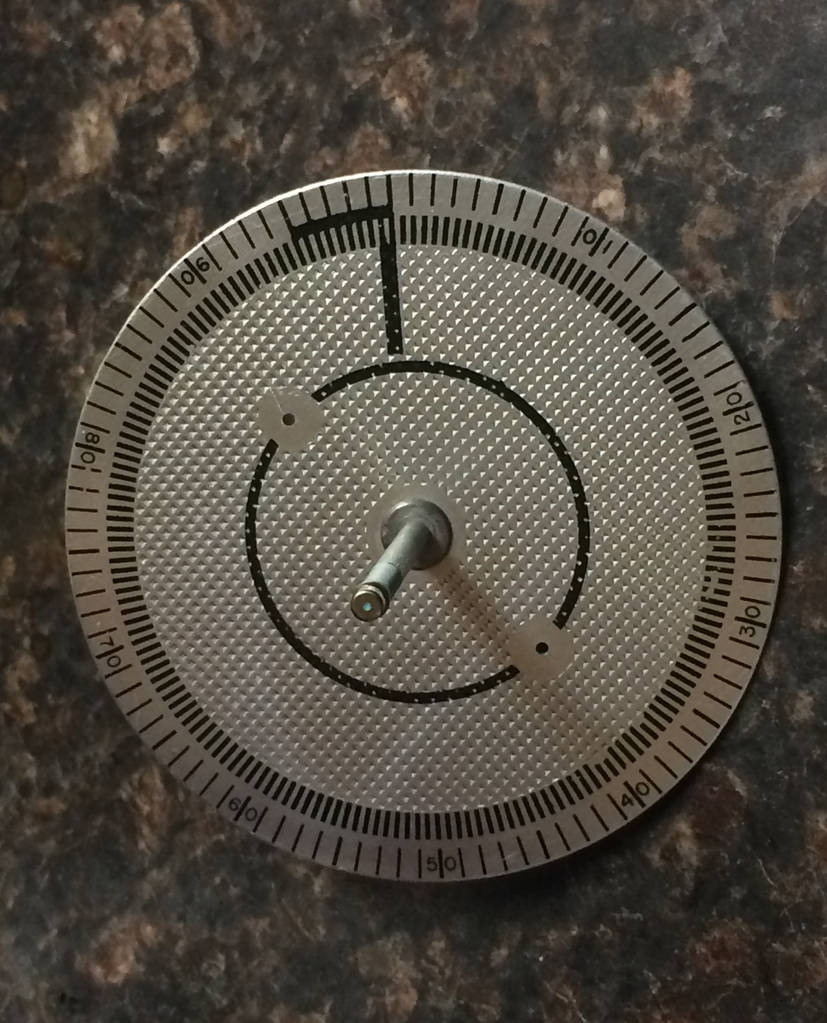
Induction disk from an electrical meter

Induction disk motor is a low-power, low-speed AC motor that is primarily known for its use in analog electrical meters. It is also called a Ferraris disk after the inventor, Galileo Ferraris.

== Construction ==
The rotor of the motor consists of a conductive disk, through which a changing magnetic flux is applied by one or more split phase electromagnetic coils. Eddy currents are generated in the disk and the reaction between the eddy currents and the flux produces the driving torque.

The design of an induction electrical meter uses pairs of coils, one using the current to be measured, one voltage on the terminals. The design of coils makes the magnetic fields in each pair out-of-phase, inducing the torque proportional to the current and voltage. A permanent magnet works as a brake ("retarding element") making the speed proportional to the torque.

== Applications ==
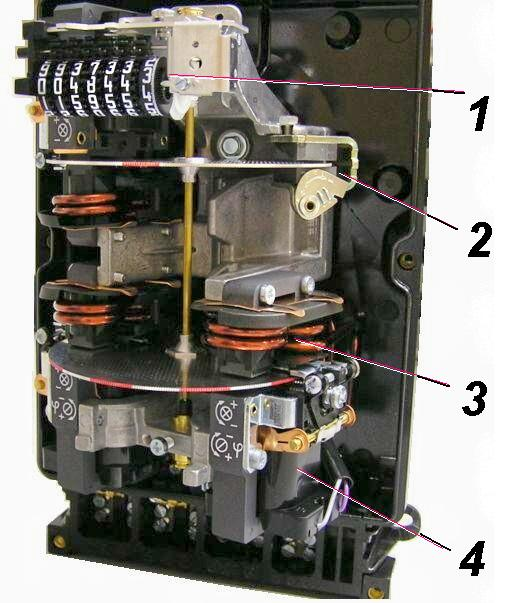
A three-phase electricity meter (open) using two induction disks on a common shaft: (1) counter, (2) adjustable eddy brake (permanent magnet), (3) one of the three current coils (4) – one of the three voltage coils

Due to its low efficiency, the induction disk motor applications are limited. The motors are best known for their use in the common household induction-type electrical meters. The motors were also used in electromechanical time switches.

In the 1920s, the motors briefly found a niche in phonographs, displacing the spring power due to the advantages of silent operation, constant speed, lack of vibration, and reliability. The shaft of a relatively powerful motor (35 watts) was vertical and directly connected to the turntable with no speed reducing gears. The motor had high torque (6 inch-ounces), giving it rapid acceleration while starting. The 78 to 80 revolutions per minute speed was controlled by a fly-ball governor.

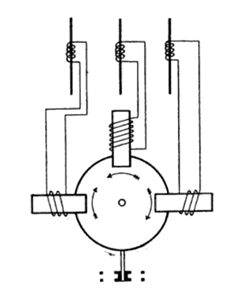
Protective relay checking the balancing of three phases based on the Ferraris disk

The Ferraris disks were used in the electromechanical relays used for power system protection. The accompanying illustration shows a device where the disk rotation triggers the action for a circuit breaker (not shown). One of the three coils is wired in opposition to the other two, but uses twice the turns. This produces a situation in which the forces applied to the disk are roughly balanced and the disk does not rotate, held in place by adjustable force. If the three phase currents become unbalanced (for example, due to an electrical fault), the disk rotates and a protective action is initiated.

== Sources ==
- American Institute of Electrical Engineers (June 1926). "Induction Disk Phonograph Motor". Transactions of the American Institute of Electrical Engineers. American Institute of Electrical Engineers.
- McColl, A.E. (1920). "Automatic Protective Devices for Alternating-Current Systems". Journal of the Institution of Electrical Engineers. 58 (293). IEE: 525–554.
- Webster, John G. (2003-07-15). "Ac Induction Energy Meters". Electrical Measurement, Signal Processing, and Displays. CRC Press. ISBN 978-0-203-00940-6.
