= Static relay =

Type of relay without moving parts

In electrical systems, a static relay is a type of relay, an electrically operated switch, that has no moving parts. Static relays are contrasted with electromechanical relays, which use moving parts to create a switching action. Both types of relay control electrical circuits through a switch that is open or closed depending upon an electrical input.

Static relays have been designed to perform similar functions with the use of electronic circuit control as an electromechanical relay performs with the use of moving parts or elements. For example, in an induction type electromechanical relay, the time delay for the switching action can be adjusted by adjusting the distance traveled by the disc, whereas in a static relay the delay can be set by adjusting the value of the resistance in an R-C time delay circuit.

Static relays may be based on analog solid state circuits, digital logic circuits, or microprocessor-based designs. Some authors use the term "static relay" to refer only to solid state relays.

== Structure ==
A static relay consists of:

- An input circuit that measures the value of desired property
- A comparator circuit that compares the measured value to a preset threshold
- An optional time delay circuit that controls the timing of the switch action after the input has reached the threshold
- A power supply for the static relay circuits

For example, an overcurrent protective relay may have an AC to DC power supply for the input circuit, a level detector circuit and an RC time delay circuit. While early comparators used discrete transistor circuits, modern designs use operational amplifiers.
