= ANSI device numbers =

System of identifying electrical power devices

In electric power systems and industrial automation, ANSI Device Numbers can be used to identify equipment and devices in a system such as relays, circuit breakers, or instruments. The device numbers are enumerated in ANSI/IEEE Standard C37.2 Standard for Electrical Power System Device Function Numbers, Acronyms, and Contact Designations.

Many of these devices protect electrical systems and individual system components from damage when an unwanted event occurs such as an electrical fault. Historically, a single protective function was performed by one or more distinct electromechanical devices, so each device would receive its own number. Today, microprocessor-based relays can perform multiple of these functions in one device. When a device falls under the above category, it is typically denoted "11" by the standard as a "Multifunction Device", but ANSI Device Numbers are still used in documentation like single-line diagrams or schematics to indicate which specific functions are performed.

ANSI/IEEE C37.2-2008 is one of a continuing series of revisions of the standard, which originated in 1928 as American Institute of Electrical Engineers Standard No. 26.

== List of device numbers and acronyms ==
- 1 - Master Element
- 2 - Time-delay Starting or Closing Relay
- 3 - Checking or Interlocking Relay, complete Sequence
- 4 - Master Protective
- 5 - Stopping Device, Emergency Stop Switch
- 6 - Starting Circuit Breaker
- 7 - Rate of Change Relay
- 7F - Alternative number for Rate Of Change Of Frequency Relay (ROCOF)
- 8 - Control Power Disconnecting Device
- 9 - Reversing Device
- 10 - Unit Sequence Switch
- 11 - Multifunction Device
- 12 - Overspeed Device
- 13 - Synchronous-Speed Device
- 14 - Underspeed Device
- 15 - Speed or Frequency Matching Device
- 16 - Data Communications Device
- 17 - Shunting or Discharge Switch
- 18 - Accelerating or Decelerating Device
- 19 - Starting-to-Running Transition Contactor
- 20 - Electrically-Operated Valve (Solenoid Valve)
- 21 - Distance Relay
- 21G - Ground Distance
- 21P - Phase Distance
- 22 - Equalizer Circuit Breaker
- 23 - Temperature control device, Heater
- 24 - Volts per Hertz Relay (in some old analog applications, a 59 and an 81 device would be chained together as a 59/81 to implement the equivalent of V/Hz protection)
- 25 - Synchronizing or Synchronism-check Device
- 26 - Apparatus Thermal Device, Temperature Switch
- 27 - Undervoltage Relay
- 27P - Phase Undervoltage
- 27S - DC Undervoltage Relay
- 27TN - Third Harmonic Neutral Undervoltage
- 27TN/59N - 100% Stator Earth Fault
- 27X - Auxiliary Undervoltage
- 27 AUX - Undervoltage Auxiliary Input
- 27/27X - Bus/Line Undervoltage
- 27/50 - Inadvertent Energization
- 28 - Flame Detector
- 29 - Isolating Contactor
- 30 - Annunciator Relay
- 31 - Separate Excitation Device
- 32 - Directional Power Relay
- 32L - Low Forward Power
- 32H - High Directional Power
- 32N - Wattmetric Zero-Sequence Directional
- 32P - Directional Power
- 32R - Reverse Power
- 33 - Position Switch
- 34 - Master Sequence Device
- 35 - Brush-Operating or Slip-ring Short Circuiting Device
- 36 - Polarity or Polarizing Voltage Device
- 37 - Undercurrent or Underpower Relay
- 37P - Underpower
- 38 - Bearing Protective Device / Bearing Rtd
- 39 - Mechanical Condition Monitor (Vibration)
- 40 - Field Relay / Loss of Excitation
- 41 - Field Circuit Breaker
- 42 - Running Circuit Breaker
- 43 - Manual Transfer or Selector Device
- 44 - Unit Sequence Starting Relay
- 45 - Atmospheric Condition Monitor (fumes, smoke, fire)
- 46 - Reverse-Phase or Phase Balance Current Relay or Stator Current Unbalance
- 47 - Phase-Sequence or Phase Balance Voltage Relay
- 48 - Incomplete Sequence Relay / Blocked Rotor
- 49 - Machine or Transformer Thermal Relay / Thermal Overload
- 49RTD - RTD Biased Thermal Overload
- 50 - Instantaneous Overcurrent Relay
- 50BF - Breaker Failure or LBB (Local Breaker Back-up)
- 50DD - Current Disturbance Detector
- 50EF - End Fault Protection
- 50G - Ground Instantaneous Overcurrent
- 50IG - Isolated Ground Instantaneous Overcurrent
- 50LR - Acceleration Time
- 50N - Neutral Instantaneous Overcurrent
- 50NBF - Neutral Instantaneous Breaker Failure
- 50P - Phase Instantaneous Overcurrent
- 50SG - Sensitive Ground Instantaneous Overcurrent
- 50SP - Split Phase Instantaneous Current
- 50Q - Negative Sequence Instantaneous Overcurrent
- 50/27 - Inadvertent Energization
- 50/51 - Instantaneous / Time-delay Overcurrent relay
- 50/74 - CT Trouble
- 50/87 - Instantaneous Differential
- 51 - AC Time Overcurrent Relay
- 51C - Voltage Controlled Time Overcurrent
- 51G - Ground Time Overcurrent
- 51LR - AC Inverse Time Overcurrent (Locked Rotor) Protection Relay
- 51N - Neutral Time Overcurrent
- 51P - Phase Time Overcurrent
- 51R - Locked / Stalled Rotor
- 51V - Voltage Restrained Time Overcurrent
- 51Q - Negative Sequence Time Overcurrent
- 52 – AC Circuit Breaker
- 52a - AC Circuit Breaker Position (contact open when circuit breaker open)
- 52b - AC Circuit Breaker Position (contact closed when circuit breaker open)
- 53 - Exciter or DC Generator Relay
- 54 - Turning Gear Engaging Device
- 55 - Power Factor Relay
- 56 - Field Application Relay
- 57 - Short-Circuiting or Grounding Device
- 58 - Rectification Failure Relay
- 59 - Overvoltage Relay
- 59B - Bank Phase Overvoltage
- 59N - Neutral Overvoltage
- 59NU - Neutral Voltage Unbalance
- 59P - Phase Overvoltage
- 59X - Auxiliary Overvoltage
- 59Q - Negative Sequence Overvoltage
- 60 - Voltage or Current Balance Relay
- 60N - Neutral Current Unbalance
- 60P - Phase Current Unbalance
- 61 - Density Switch or Sensor
- 62 - Time-Delay Stopping or Opening Relay
- 63 - Pressure Switch Detector
- 64 - Ground Protective Relay
- 64F - Field Ground Protection
- 64R – Rotor Earth Fault
- 64REF – Restricted Earth Fault Differential
- 64S – Stator Earth Fault
- 64S - Sub-harmonic Stator Ground Protection
- 64TN - 100% Stator Ground
- 65 - Governor
- 66 - Notching or Jogging Device/Maximum Starting Rate/Starts per Hour/Time Between Starts
- 67 - AC Directional Overcurrent Relay
- 67G - Ground Directional Overcurrent
- 67N - Neutral Directional Overcurrent
- 67Ns – Earth Fault Directional
- 67P - Phase Directional Overcurrent
- 67SG - Sensitive Ground Directional Overcurrent
- 67Q - Negative Sequence Directional Overcurrent
- 68 - Blocking Relay / Power Swing Blocking
- 69 - Permissive Control Device
- 70 - Rheostat
- 71 - Liquid Switch, Level Switch
- 72 - DC Circuit Breaker
- 73 - Load-Resistor Contactor
- 74 - Alarm Relay
- 75 - Position Changing Mechanism
- 76 - DC Overcurrent Relay
- 77 - Telemetering Device, Speed Sensor
- 78 - Phase Angle Measuring or Out-of-Step Protective Relay
- 78V - Loss of Mains
- 79 - AC Reclosing Relay / Auto Reclose
- 80 - Liquid or Gas Flow Relay
- 81 - Frequency Relay
- 81O - Over Frequency
- 81R - common industry use for Rate Of Change Of Frequency Relay (ROCOF)
- 81U - Under Frequency
- 82 - DC Reclosing Relay
- 83 - Automatic Selective Control or Transfer Relay
- 84 - Operating Mechanism
- 85 - Pilot Communications, Carrier or Pilot-Wire Relay
- 86 - Lock-Out Relay, Master Trip Relay
- 87 - Differential Protective Relay
- 87B - Bus Differential
- 87G - Generator Differential
- 87GT - Generator/Transformer Differential
- 87L - Segregated Line Current Differential
- 87LG - Ground Line Current Differential
- 87M - Motor Differential
- 87N - Neutral Differential Protection / Restricted Earth Fault (REF) see also 87RGF
- 87O - Overall Differential
- 87PC - Phase Comparison
- 87RGF - Restricted Ground Fault see also 87N
- 87R - Restrained Differential
- 87S - Stator Differential
- 87S - Percent Differential
- 87T - Transformer Differential
- 87U - Unrestrained Differential
- 87V - Voltage Differential
- 87Z - High-Impedance Differential
- 88 - Auxiliary Motor or Motor Generator
- 89 - Line Switch
- 90 - Regulating Device
- 91 - Voltage Directional Relay
- 92 - Voltage And Power Directional Relay
- 93 - Field-Changing Contactor
- 94 - Tripping or Trip-Free Relay
- 95 – Trip Circuit Healthy
- 96 – Transmitter
- 97 – For specific applications where other numbers are not suitable
- 98 – For specific applications where other numbers are not suitable
- 99 – For specific applications where other numbers are not suitable

Acronyms Description

- AFD - Arc Flash Detector
- CLK - Clock or Timing Source
- CLP - Cold Load Pickup
- DDR – Dynamic Disturbance Recorder
- DFR – Digital Fault Recorder
- DME – Disturbance Monitor Equipment
- ENV – Environmental Data
- HIZ – High Impedance Fault Detector
- HMI – Human Machine Interface
- HST – Historian
- LGC – Scheme Logic
- MET – Substation Metering
- PDC – Phasor Data Concentrator
- PMU – Phasor Measurement Unit
- PQM – Power Quality Monitor
- RIO – Remote Input/Output Device
- RTD - Resistance Temperature Detector
- RTU – Remote Terminal Unit/Data Concentrator
- SER – Sequence of Events Recorder
- TCM – Trip Circuit Monitor
- LRSS – Local/Remote selector switch
- VTFF - Vt Fuse Fail

Suffixes Description

- _1 - Positive-Sequence
- _2 - Negative-Sequence
- A - Alarm, Auxiliary Power
- AC - Alternating Current
- AN - Anode
- B - Bus, Battery, or Blower
- BF - Breaker Failure
- BK - Brake
- BL - Block (Valve)
- BP - Bypass
- BT - Bus Tie
- BU - Backup
- C - Capacitor, Condenser, Compensator, Carrier Current, Case or Compressor
- CA - Cathode
- CH - Check (Valve)
- D - Discharge (Valve)
- DC - Direct Current
- DCB - Directional Comparison Blocking
- DCUB - Directional Comparison Unblocking
- DD - Disturbance Detector
- DUTT - Direct Underreaching Transfer Trip
- E - Exciter
- F - Feeder, Field, Filament, Filter, or Fan
- G - Ground or Generator
- GC - Ground Check
- H - Heater or Housing
- L - Line or Logic
- M - Motor or Metering
- MOC - Mechanism Operated Contact
- N - Neutral or Network
- O - Over
- P - Phase or Pump
- PC - Phase Comparison
- POTT - Pott: Permissive Overreaching Transfer Trip
- PUTT - Putt: Permissive Underreaching Transfer Trip
- R - Reactor, Rectifier, or Room
- S - Synchronizing, Secondary, Strainer, Sump, or Suction (Valve)
- SOTF - Switch On To Fault
- T - Transformer or Thyratron
- TD - Time Delay
- TDC - Time-Delay Closing Contact
- TDDO - Time Delayed Relay Coil Drop-Out
- TDO - Time-Delay Opening Contact
- TDPU - Time Delayed Relay Coil Pickup
- THD - Total Harmonic Distortion
- TH - Transformer (High-Voltage Side)
- TL - Transformer (Low-Voltage Side)
- TM - Telemeter
- TT - Transformer (Tertiary-Voltage Side)
- Q - Lube Oil
- W - Water
- F - Fuel
- G - Gas
- U - Under or Unit
- X - Auxiliary
- Z - Impedance

== Suffixes ==
suffix letter or number  may be used with the device number; for example, suffix N is used if the device is connected to a Neutral wire (example: 59N in a relay is used for protection against Neutral Displacement); and suffixes X, Y, Z are used for auxiliary devices. Similarly, the "G" suffix can denote a "ground", hence a "51G" is a time overcurrent ground relay. The "G" suffix can also mean "generator", hence an "87G" is a Generator Differential Protective Relay while an "87T" is a Transformer Differential Protective Relay. "F" can denote "field" on a generator or "fuse", as in the protective fuse for a pickup transformer. Suffix numbers are used to distinguish multiple "same" devices in the same equipment such as 51–1, 51–2.[3]

Device numbers may be combined if the device provides multiple functions, such as the Instantaneous / Time-delay Overcurrent relay denoted as 50/51.

For device 16, the suffix letters further define the device: the first suffix letter is 'S' for serial or 'E' for Ethernet. The subsequent letters are: 'C' security processing function (e.g. VPN, encryption), 'F' firewall or message filter, 'M' network managed function, 'R' rotor, 'S' switch and 'T' telephone component. Thus a managed Ethernet switch would be 16ESM.
