= Pitch bearing =

Component connecting a wind turbine blade to the hub

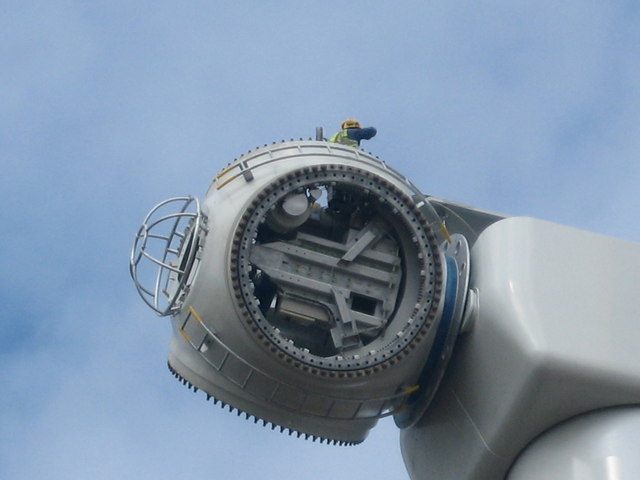
Rotor hub and pitch bearing without mounted rotor blades

The pitch bearing, or blade bearing, is a component of modern wind turbines which connects a rotor blade to the hub. The bearing allows the adjustments to the blade pitch, which helps control the loads and power of the wind turbine. The pitch system brings the blade to the desired position by adapting the aerodynamic angle of attack. The pitch system is also used for emergency brakes of the turbine system.

== Design ==
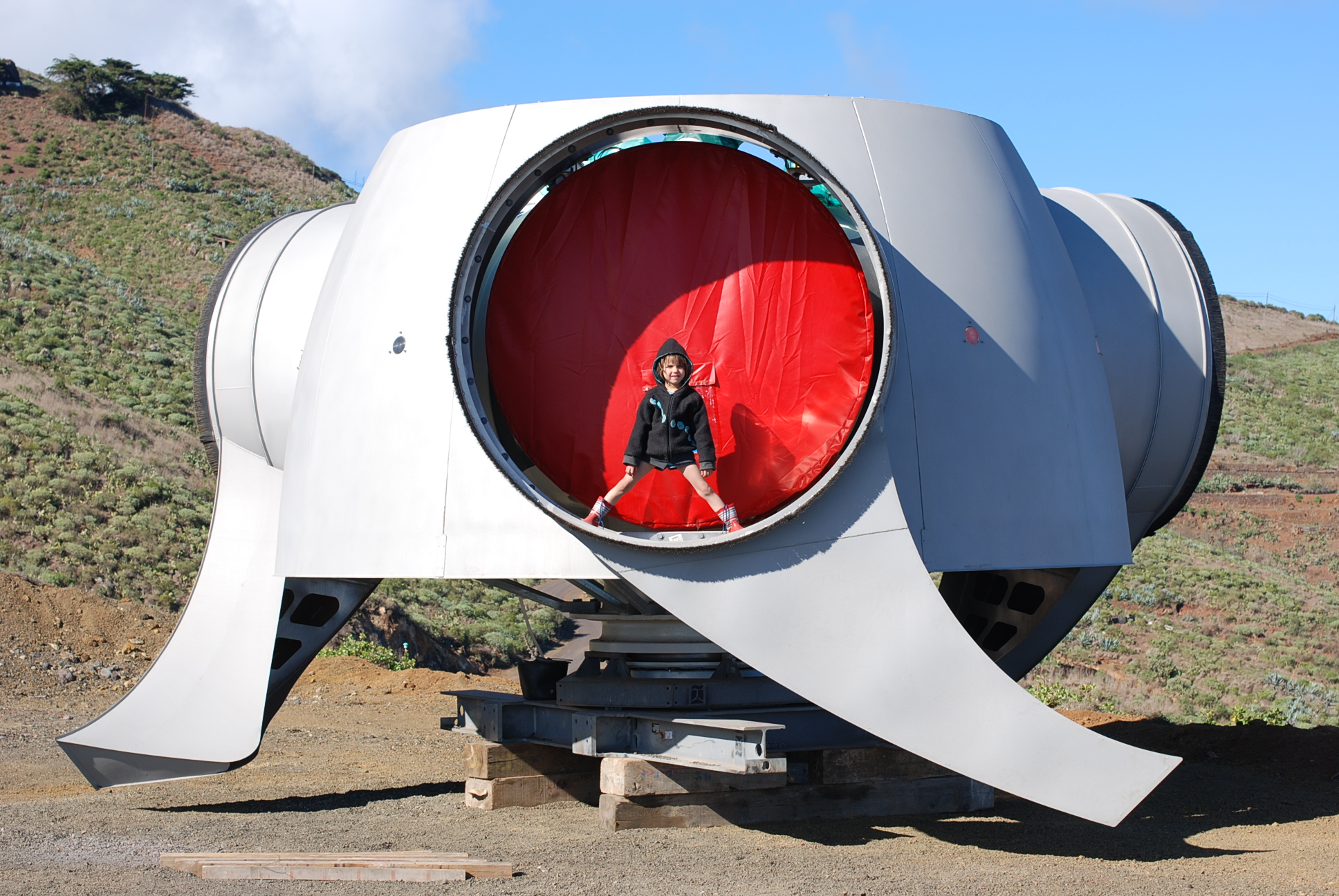
Size comparison: Child in wind turbine rotor hub without blades

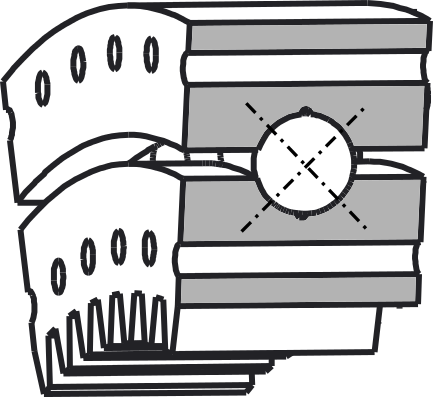
One-row, four-point-contact ball bearing with gear spur for the pitch drive

Mostly, large rolling-element bearings are used as pitch bearings. The bearing is subjected to high bending moments and radial and axial loads in both directions. Therefore, the rolling elements for state-of-the-art wind turbines are ball bearings, which are used in a double-rowed four-point contact. This means that each raceway carries on two points, and in sum four points are carrying. Other possible options are different arrangements of the rolling elements or multirow cylindrical roller bearings. Pitch bearings of modern wind turbines can reach diameters of more than 4 meters.

Changing the lubricants can be carried out only with great time and cost expenditure. Furthermore, due to the constant rotation of the hub, the used lubricant must remain in place. Therefore, the pitch bearings in wind turbines are usually lubricated with grease. The bearing experiences a wide range of operating conditions during operation. Therefore, the operating conditions are very difficult for greases over the turbine's life. The industrial greases that have been used so far have very different compositions and do not always lead to the desired result of preventing wear.

== Load situation ==
The loads and operating situations of pitch bearings are comparatively unfavorable for rolling-element bearings. The bearings are exposed to high loads and small reciprocating movements created by the pitch system or vibrations from the wind profile. The small reciprocating movements between the rolling elements and raceway can lead to wear phenomena like false brinelling and fretting corrosion. Furthermore, the high loads can lead to truncation of the contact ellipse. Due to the small reciprocating movements, typical calculation methods to estimate the bearing service life and the friction torque are not suitable for pitch bearings. Newer controlling concepts of pitch control, like individual pitch control, will lead to a different operating behavior which in the worst case could favor false brinelling and fretting corrosion or in the best case reduce such wear.

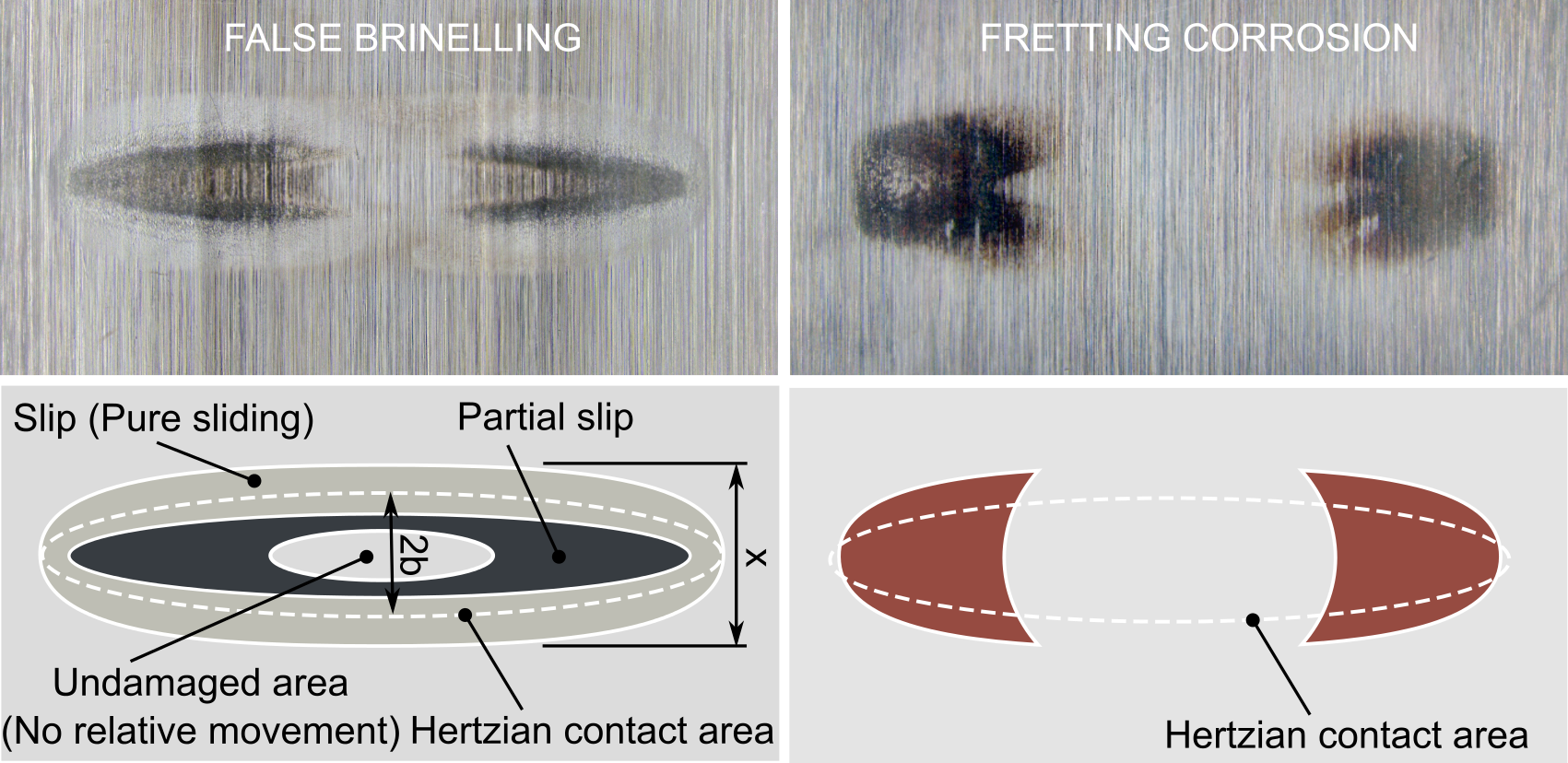
False brinelling and fretting corrosion
