= Frank E. Fish =

American marine biologist

Frank E. Fish, writing also as Frank Fish and F.E. Fish, is a marine zoologist specialising in vertebrate aquatic locomotion. He is known for his work on the hydrodynamics of the knobbly flippers of the humpback whale, which led to an improved design for wind turbine blades.

== Biography ==
Frank E. Fish took his bachelor's degree in 1975 at the State University of New York. He gained his master's degree in 1977 at Michigan State University, and his PhD in zoology at the same university in 1980. That same year he joined the biology faculty at West Chester University, Pennsylvania, where he later became professor of biology. His area of research is vertebrate aquatic locomotion, including its hydrodynamics and energy efficiency. His study of the hydrodynamics of the knobbly flippers of the humpback whale led to an improved design of wind turbine blades.

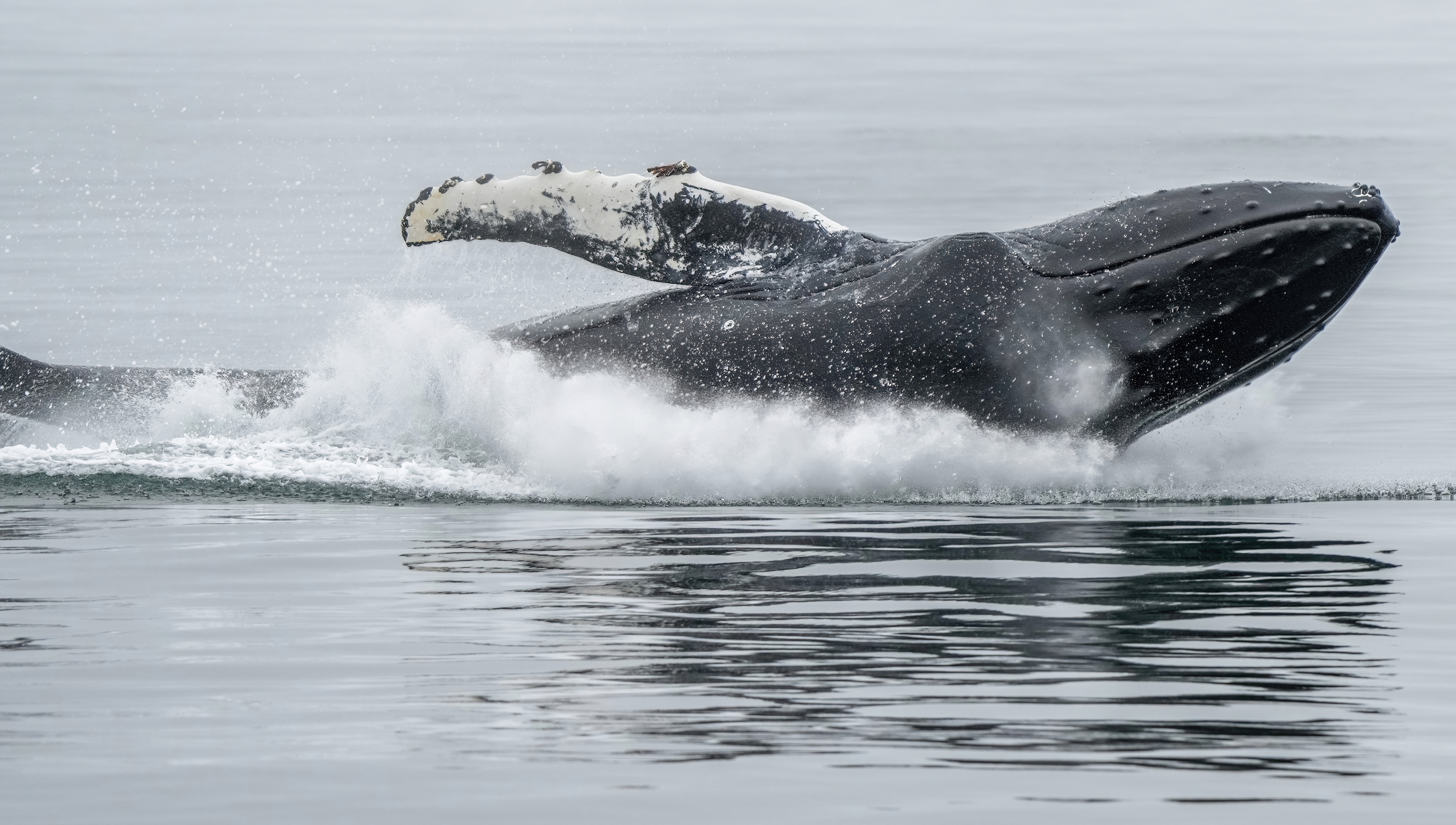
Fish's study of the knobbly flippers of the humpback whale led to an improved design for wind turbine blades.

Fish has studied swimming in marine mammals, in rays, and in sea turtles, as well as aspects of amphibious robots. He has investigated topics including jet propulsion in the frogfish Antennarius; thermoregulation in swimming muskrats; and maneuverability and stability trade-offs in manatees. He has written or co-authored over 200 research articles.

== Honours and distinctions ==
Fish has featured as a scientist in television documentaries including Walking with Prehistoric Beasts, produced by the BBC; the Evolution series produced by PBS; The Daily Planet Goes Green by the Canadian Broadcasting Corporation; the History Channel's Predator X; and National Geographic's Hooked: Flying Monsters.

In 2006, West Chester University made Fish its "Distinguished Faculty Researcher" for his scholarship.

In 2018, Fish was a finalist for the European Patent Office's European Inventor Award for his work on wind turbine blade efficiency.

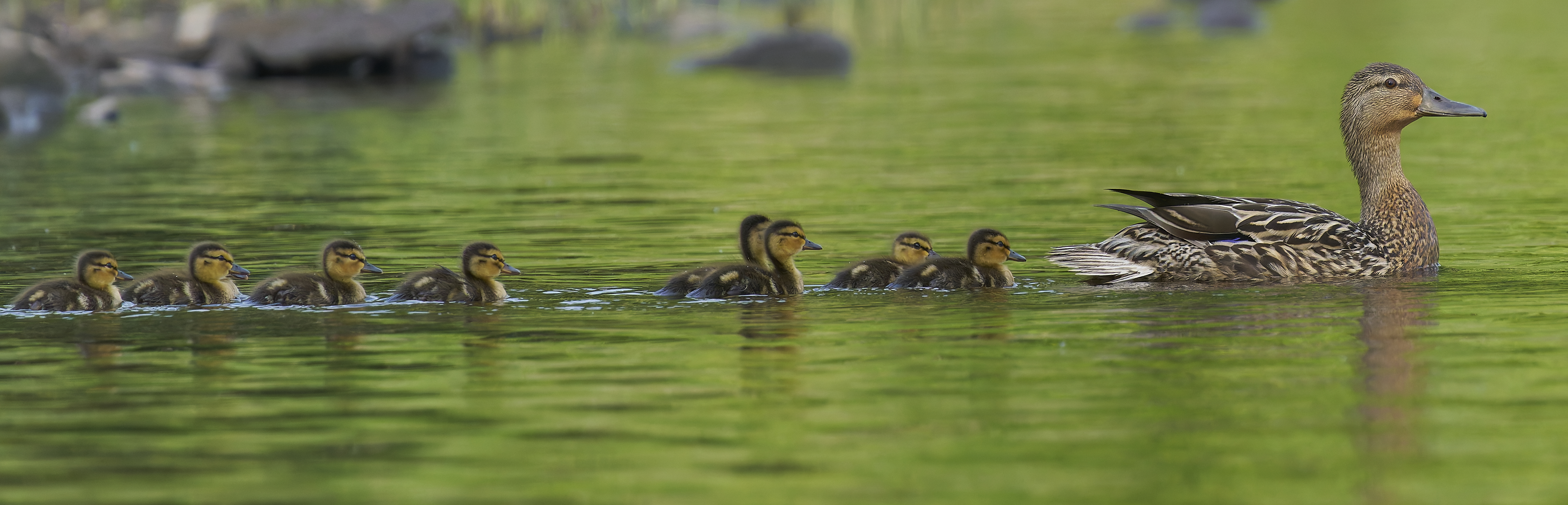
Fish won an Ig Nobel for his work on why ducklings swim in a line.

He was awarded an Ig Nobel Prize in 2022 for his work on "why ducklings swim in a line formation"; he explained that the ducklings towards the rear, especially the last, gain efficiency from the wake of the swimmer to their front.
