= Tension control bolt =

A tension control bolt (TC bolt) is a heavy duty bolt used in steel frame construction. The head is usually domed and is not designed to be driven. The end of the shank has a spline on it which is engaged by a special power wrench which prevents the bolt from turning while the nut is tightened. When the appropriate tension is reached the spline shears off.

== See also ==
- Screw list
- Shear pin
