= 2025 Iberian Peninsula blackout =

Power outage in Spain and Portugal

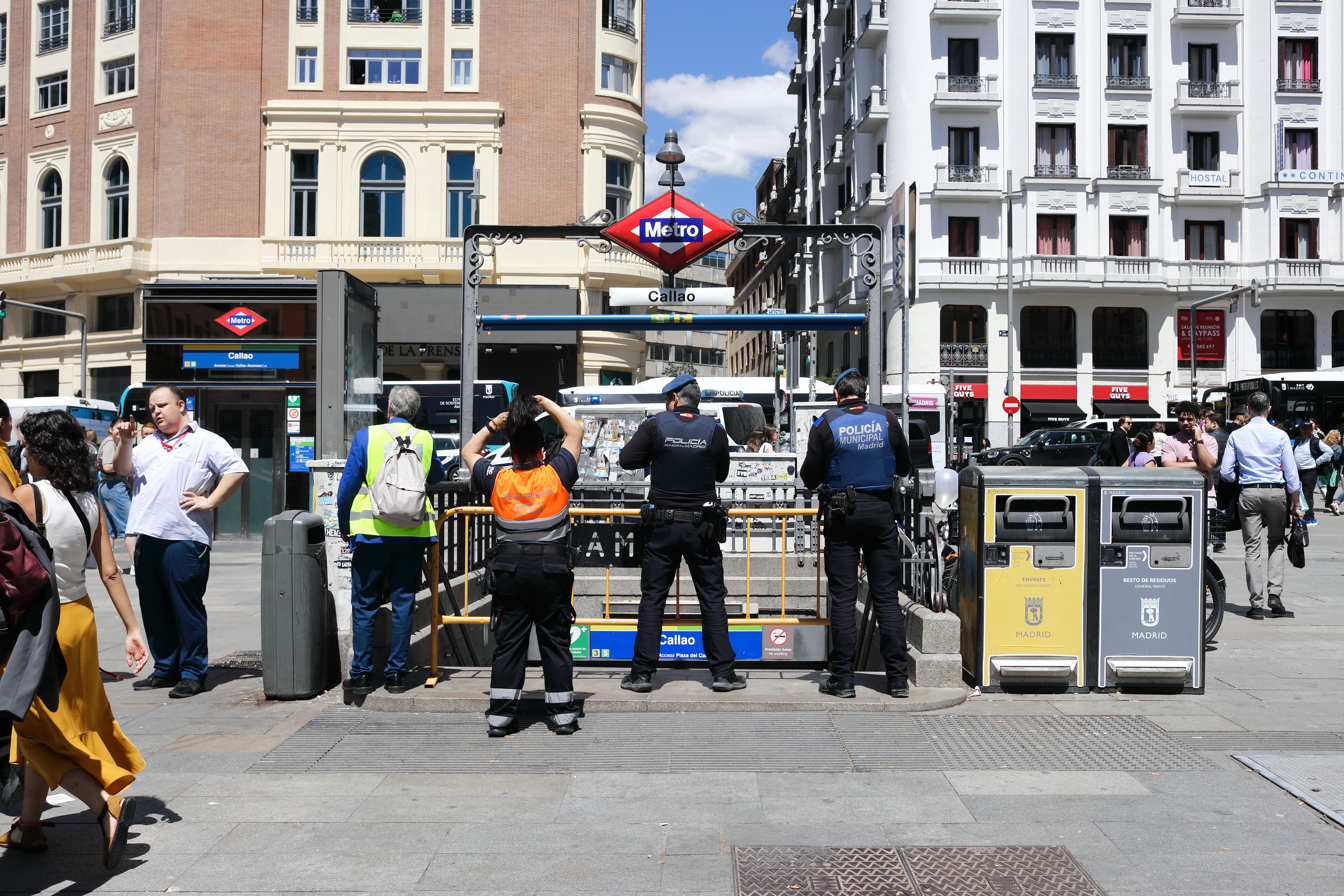
- Metro stations were closed during the blackout.
- Date: 28 April 2025
- Time: 12:33 (CEST); 11:33 (WEST)
- Location: Mainland Portugal, peninsular Spain, Andorra, and parts of southwest France
- Type: Power outage
- Cause: Overvoltage
- Deaths: 7 in Spain, 1 in Portugal
- Injuries: >25

On Monday, 28 April 2025, at 12:33 CEST (11:33 WEST; 10:33 UTC), a major power blackout occurred across the Iberian Peninsula affecting mainland Portugal and peninsular Spain, where electric power was interrupted for about ten hours in most of the Peninsula and longer in some areas. The power cut caused severe difficulties in telecommunications, transportation systems, and essential sectors such as emergency services. At least seven people in Spain and one in Portugal may have died due to outage-related circumstances like candle fires or generator exhaust fumes. The total disconnected load was 31 GW.

Minor power cuts lasting seconds or minutes occurred in adjacent regions of Andorra and parts of southwestern France. Reports indicated problems with the European synchronous electricity grid. Traffic lights in many places stopped working, and metro lines had to be evacuated.

== Grid conditions in Spain ==
1. Solar 19.5 GW (59.0%)
2. Wind 3.6 GW (12.0%)
3. Nuclear 3.3 GW (11.0%)
4. Other (13.0%)
5. Natural gas 1.6 GW (5.00%)

According to the website of the Spanish electrical operator Red Eléctrica de España (REE) that documents the power grid, there was sufficient power supplied to the grid leading up to the outage. At 12:30 on 28 April, the grid was supplied with 32 gigawatts (GW) of power to meet 25 GW of demand, and was exporting 2.6 GW to Portugal, 0.87 GW to France and 0.78 GW to Morocco. The remainder was used for hydropumping (3 GW). More than half of the power supply was from solar, and electricity price was slightly negative.

Mains frequency measured in Germany dropped by 150 mHz as a consequence of the blackout.

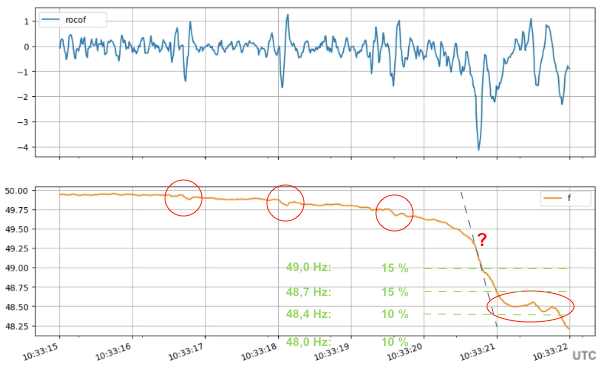
Power frequency in Southern Spain just before the blackout in orange (5 cycle average) and ROCOF in blue. Dashed lines in green indicate the thresholds for under-frequency load shedding (UFLS).

Most of the power drop occurred within five seconds, when a substation in the province of Granada failed, followed by grid failures in the provinces of Badajoz and Sevilla, and the France connection decoupled at 12:33. There was a sharp drop at around 12:33 on the automatic system that monitors electricity production in Spain, and data after the event are no longer reliable, because communication systems failed as well.

The European Network of Transmission System Operators for Electricity (ENTSO-E) and RTVE (national television) later stated "total zero in the electricity system of the Iberian Peninsula".

== Timeline ==
Sources:

- 12:03 – 12:07 CEST – first period of oscillations in the grid detected and mitigated.
- 12:19 – 12:21 CEST – second period of oscillations in the grid detected and mitigated. Since then the grid appeared stable, with no oscillations detected.
- 12:32:57 – 12:33:17 CEST – a series of generation trips in southern Spain, the first near Granada, the second near Badajoz and the third near Seville causes a loss of 2200 MW in generation capacity. Frequency decreased and voltage increased.
- 12:33:18 – 12:33:21 CEST – grid frequency of the Iberian Peninsula drops below 48.0 Hz. Automatic load shedding is activated.
- 12:33:21 CEST – AC lines between France and Spain tripped.
- 12:33:24 CEST – grid collapsed completely, the HVDC between France and Spain tripped.
- 12:44 CEST – first 400 kV Spain–France AC line is re-energised.
- 13:04 CEST – Spain–Morocco interconnect re-energised
- ?? – 13:30 CEST – Spanish hydro power stations capable of black start begin their black start procedures.
- 13:35 CEST – AC line between Spain and France on the eastern coast is re-energised.
- 16:11 CEST – first black start capable power plant in Portugal manages to start.
- 17:26 CEST – second black start capable power plant in Portugal manages to start.
- 18:36 CEST – 220 kV line between Spain and Portugal is re-energised.
- 21:35 CEST – 400 kV line between Spain and southern Portugal is re-energised.
- 00:22 CEST – grid fully restored in Portugal.
- 04:00 CEST – grid fully restored in Spain.

== Effects ==
=== Spain ===
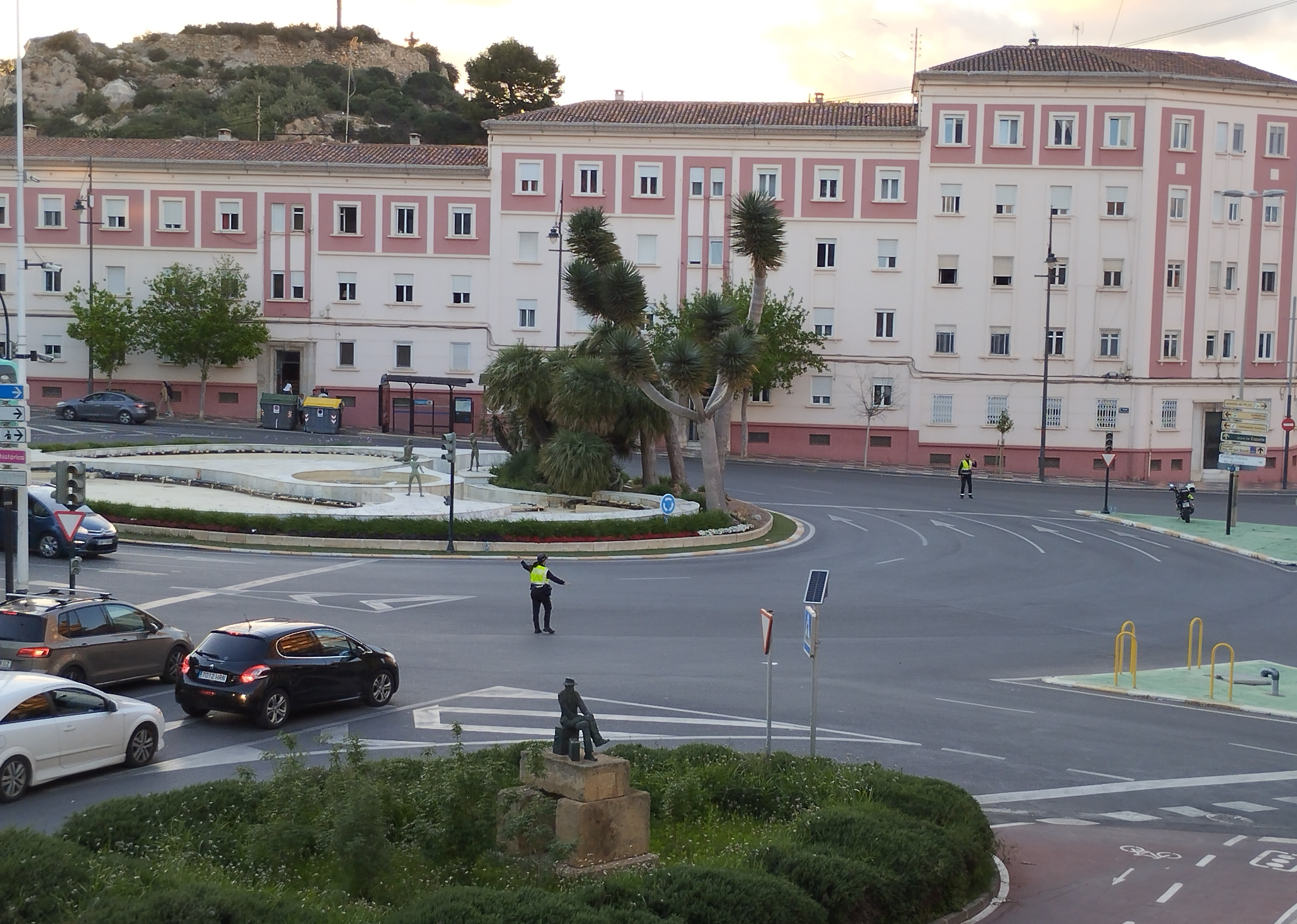
Police handling traffic in Cartagena, due to disabled traffic signals

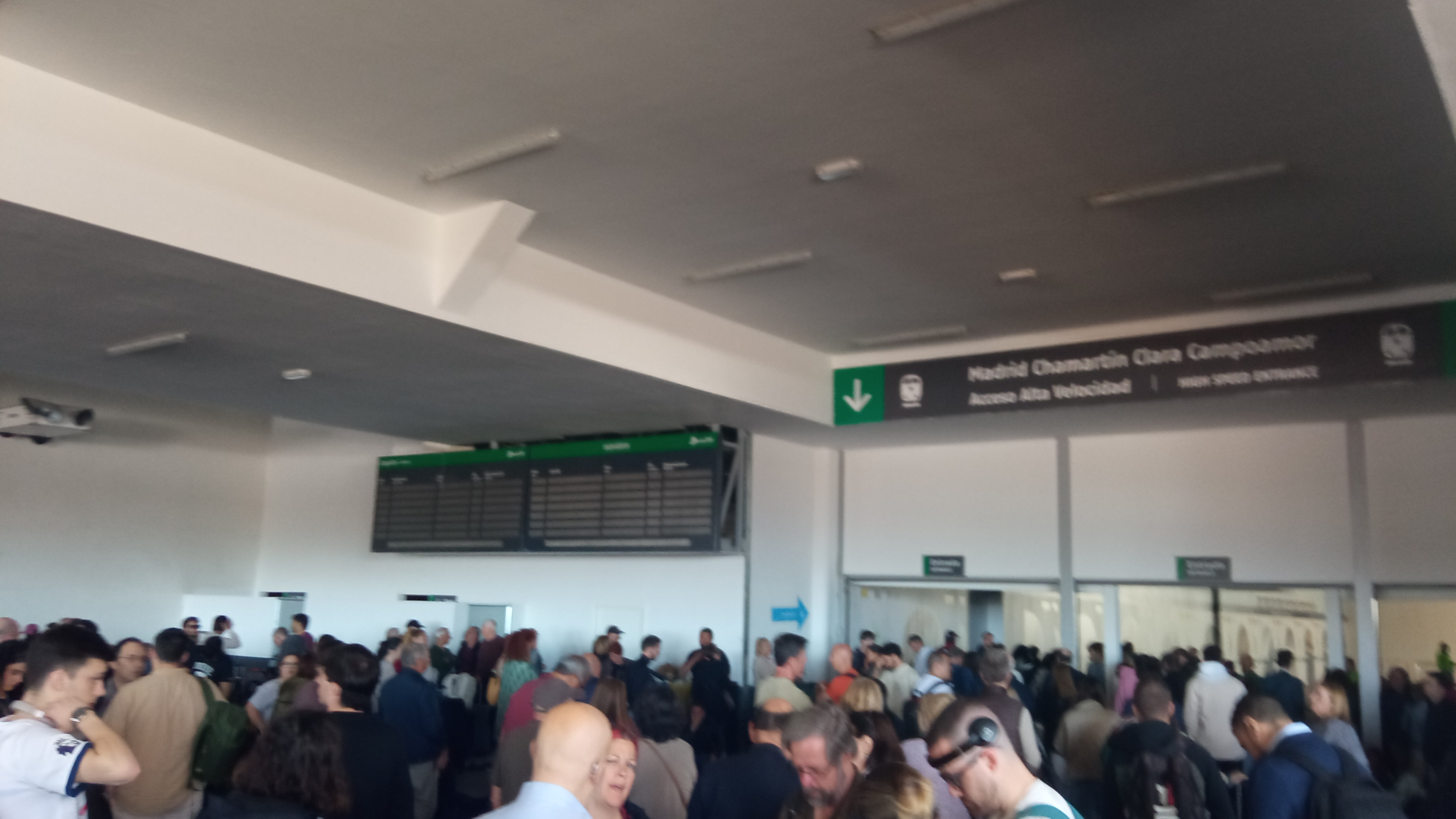
Passengers waiting at the Chamartín railway station in Madrid during the blackout

Spanish train operator Renfe said that all trains had stopped due to the outage. Around 35,000 passengers were rescued after being stranded across the rail and underground systems. Madrid's Barajas International Airport was left without power. Later in the day, airports were back to operation with 20% reduced capacity, and the Minister of Transport Óscar Puente stated that long and medium distance train services would not resume until the next day.

Telecommunications and internet services were also affected, with Netblocks saying that network traffic plunged to just 17 percent of normal usage, while satellite communications increased. Hospitals activated their backup generators and stayed mostly functional.

Spanish authorities reported that the country's nuclear power plants were taken off the grid automatically due to the loss of grid power – four reactors were generating power (3.3 GW) at the time, while three were conducting scheduled maintenance during spring when demand and prices are low. Backup generators automatically supplied cooling to keep all seven reactors safe, while some reactors prepared for re-activation.

The city of Madrid activated its emergency plan PEMAM (Plan Territorial de Emergencia Municipal del Ayuntamiento de Madrid). Most businesses and shops had to close, train and metro lines stopped, and banking was non-functional. Police had to intervene to control traffic and bring security. Confusion and fear spread in episodes reminiscent of the Coronavirus pandemic of 2020, whilst at the same time, some streets and terraces had a cheerful ambience and near-festive mood.

King Felipe VI's meeting with the president of Cyprus, Nikos Christodoulides, was unaffected because the blackout only partially affected the Palacio de la Zarzuela, and the King was able to maintain the institutional agenda for the day. The Congress of Deputies, the Bolsa de Madrid, the Parliament of Catalonia and the Palacio de la Moncloa were left without power. The Senate suspended its parliamentary activity for 29 April.

Spanish prime minister Pedro Sánchez convened an emergency meeting of the National Security Council about the power cut.

NASA satellite images show partial lighting in the middle of the night on Tuesday 29 April, as some areas remained offline.

The employers' organization CEOE estimated that the outage resulted in economic losses valued at €1.6 billion.

Certain institutions, such as the Ministry of Defence and the Navy headquarters, still suffered power outages on 29 April despite the general restoration of the electricity supply.

At least seven people died as a result of the blackout in Spain. Six deaths were recorded in Galicia, including three members of the same family who died of carbon monoxide poisoning believed to have been caused by a faulty gasoline generator in a home in Taboadela. The seventh death was recorded in a fire at a house in Madrid that left 13 others injured.

The Canary Islands, Balearic Islands, Ceuta, and Melilla were unaffected. Travellers entering Gibraltar by land from Spain reported delays due to the unavailability of IT services at the Spanish border post. Gibraltar itself was not affected, as it is not connected to the European grid.

=== Portugal ===
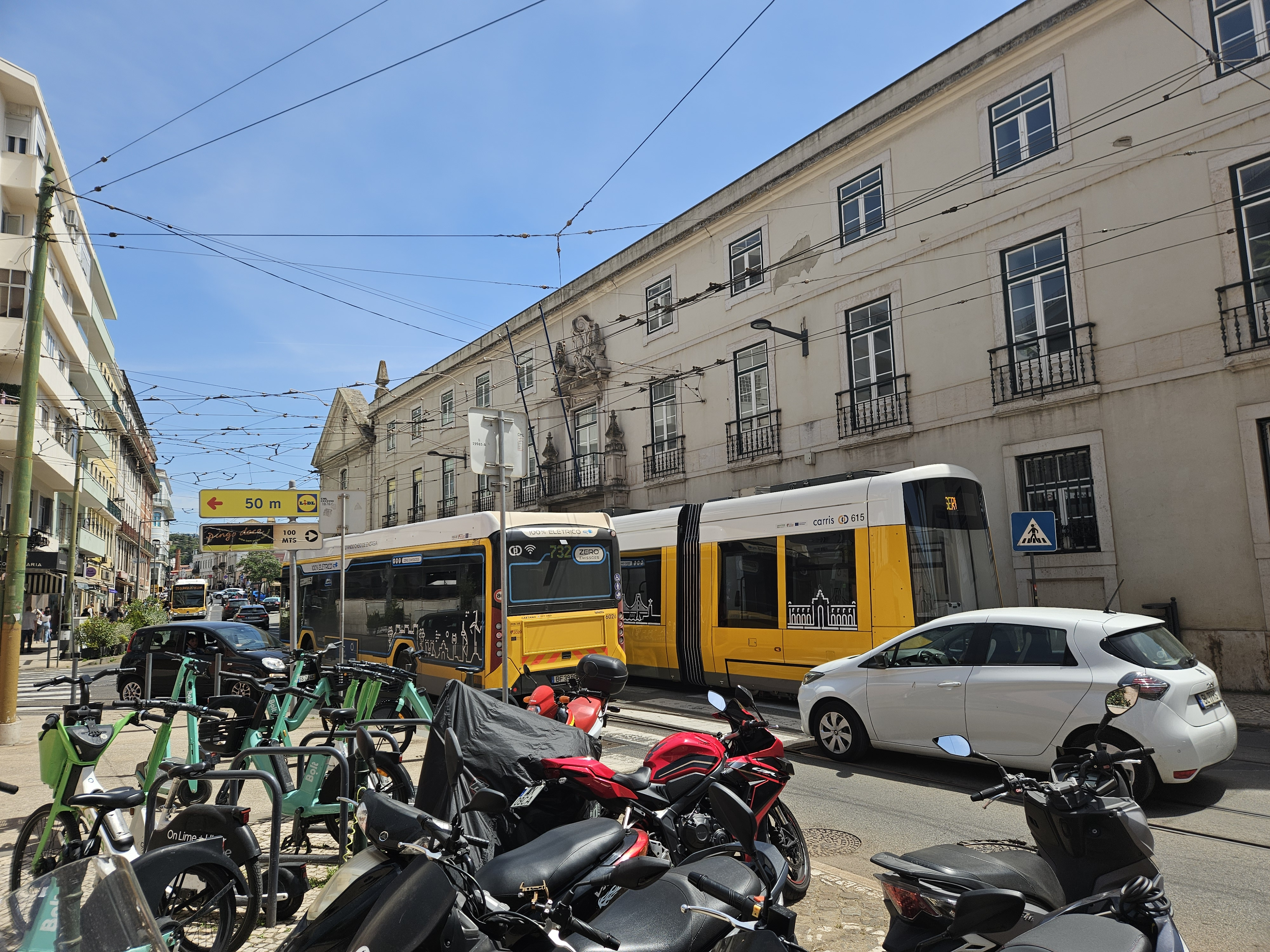
Public transportation running on electric power stopped in traffic and remained inoperational during the blackout

In Portugal, the blackout made most basic services inoperational, including stores, supermarkets, pharmacies and electronic payment systems. Hospitals resorted to generators to maintain operations. Traffic lights and transit systems were brought to a halt, causing road accidents. Additional police officers were deployed to deal with traffic problems caused by the failure of traffic lights. Mobile networks also experienced severe limitations, particularly voice calls and data services.

The commuter rail and rapid transit services were stopped due to signalling problems, and trains were evacuated. Nonetheless, rail transport was not particularly affected since Comboios de Portugal were on strike that day. Electric buses, boats, ridesharing bicycles and trams were unable to depart their stations. Lisbon Airport operated with limitations and closed at around 13:00 WEST (14:00 CEST), although flights were allowed to take off from around 21:38 WEST. Meanwhile, airports in Porto and Faro switched to generator power.

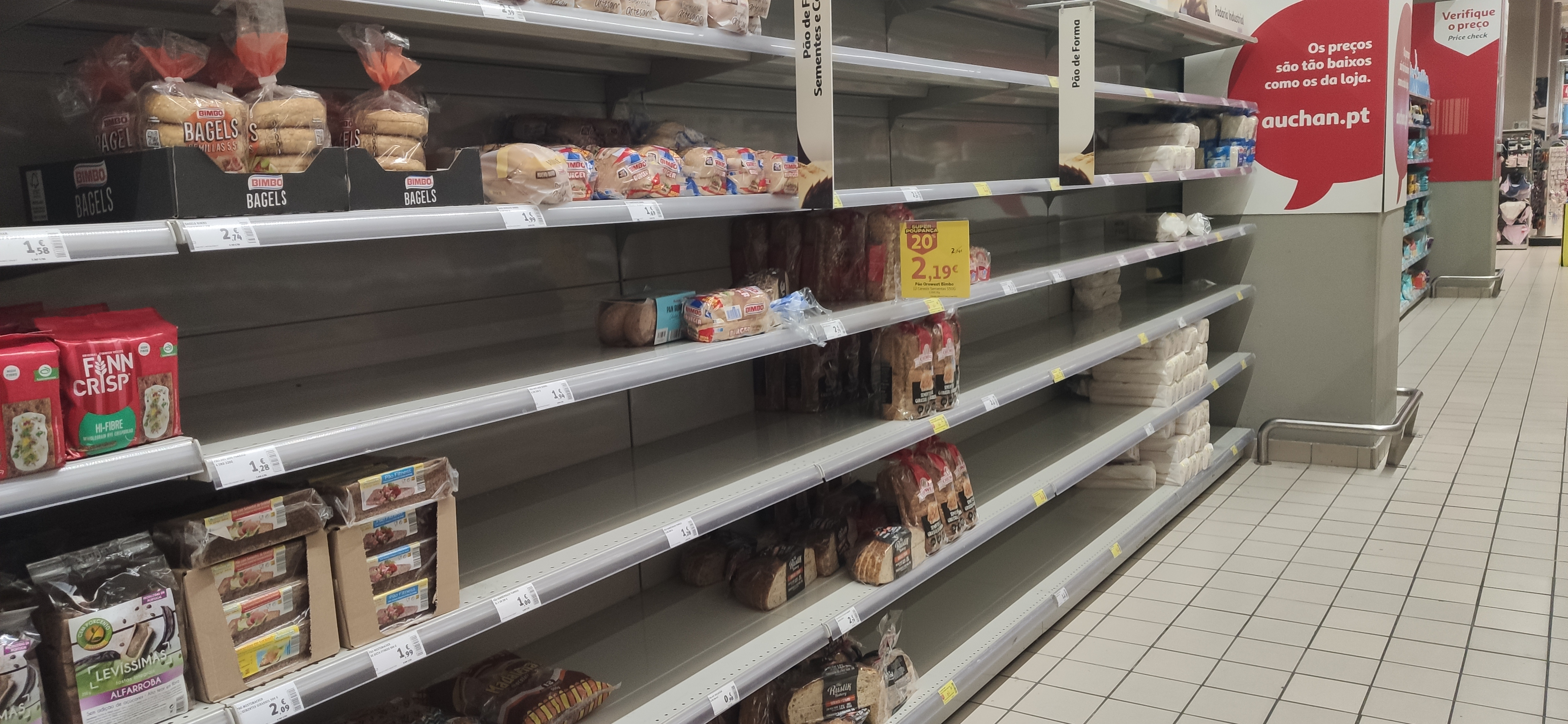
Empty shelves in the pastry section of the Auchan Supermarket in Aqua Shopping centre of Portimão due to panic buying after the blackout.

During the blackout, there was a scramble to stock up on essential items such as food and water, as well as batteries, lighting devices, and radios. The state-owned water company Águas de Portugal asked consumers to moderate their water usage to prevent system failures during the power cut. Even after the blackout, certain services such as the Portuguese Tax Portal remained offline until service could be restored on Wednesday.

The cabinet of Prime Minister Luís Montenegro held an emergency meeting over the power cut, and declared an energy crisis on 28 April. The Prime Minister planned to ask the European Union for an audit of the affected electrical systems. He also took the decision to keep Tapada do Outeiro black start capability available until at least 2030 and expand that capability to at least two more locations, Alqueva Dam and Baixo Sabor Dam.

At least one person died as a result of the blackout in Portugal. The 77-year-old victim was connected to a mechanical ventilator at home 24 hours a day. According to state-owned TV channel RTP, the breathing aid ran out of battery, and the National Emergency Medical Service did not arrive in time to help her.

As with the Canary Islands, the distant island regions of Madeira and the Azores in the Atlantic Ocean have never been connected with the European grid, and they remained unaffected.

=== Andorra ===
Andorran electricity supplier Forces Elèctriques d'Andorra said that the power outage from Spain affected the principality for a few seconds. An automatic recovery system connected Andorra's power grid to France's. Phone and internet operator Andorra Telecom reported a similar outage for internet connections.

=== France ===
Electricity transmission system operator Réseau de Transport d'Électricité (RTE) reported a power outage that lasted only a few minutes in the French Basque Country. Reactor 1 at the Golfech Nuclear Power Plant disconnected around 12:33, and restarted the next day.

=== Secondary effects ===
==== Morocco ====
Internet providers such as Orange experienced problems in Morocco due to servers in Spain being offline.

==== Greenland ====
Telecommunications in the villages of Qaanaaq, Ittoqqortoormiit, and Tasiilaq in Greenland were disrupted from 18:30 to 00:36 WGST (19:30–01:36 UTC) because Tusass and other telecommunications companies lost connection with equipment in Maspalomas Station on Gran Canaria island. Although the antenna is on Gran Canaria, the cable goes through mainland Spain before transmission to the antenna and then satellite.

==== Canary Islands ====
In the Canary Islands, some phone and mobile communications were affected from late afternoon, lasting throughout the evening. Users of the Movistar and Orange networks first started reporting problems at around 15:00. This caused emergency services to be unreachable for several hours and card payments in shops and restaurants stopped working.

== Power restoration ==
=== Spain ===
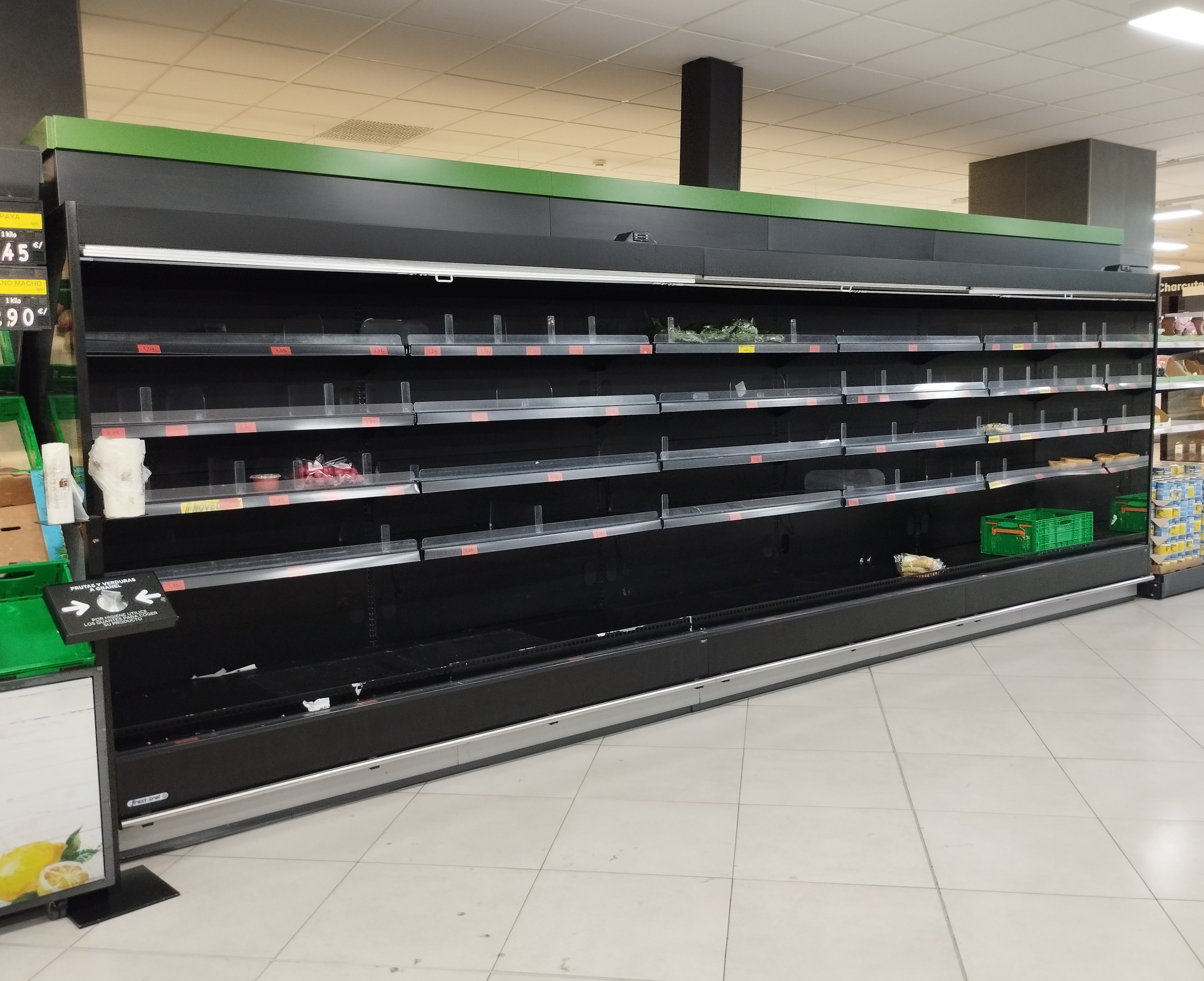
Empty shelves in the fruit section of Mercadona La Vaguada in Cartagena, Spain, as a result of the panic buying triggered by the outage

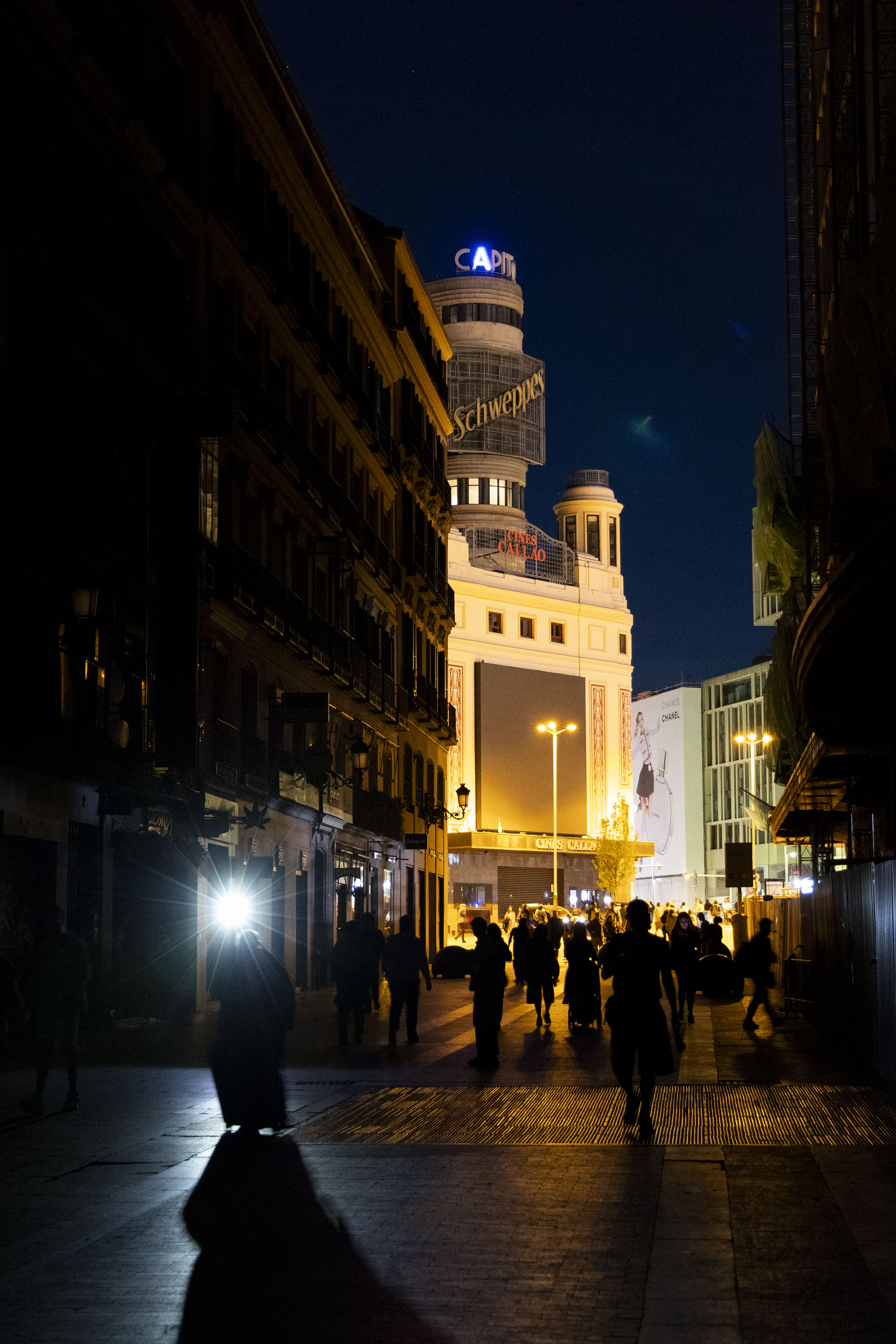
View from Preciados Street towards Callao Square in Madrid during the blackout, with Preciados still dark while Callao has partial power restored

About 16:00 CEST on 28 April, Spanish electrical operator Red Eléctrica de España (REE) estimated it would take "between six and ten hours" to restore service calling the outage "exceptional and totally extraordinary". The international power lines from France first restarted the regions Aragón-Cataluña and Galicia-León, which then repowered the main grid. Hydropower and gas turbines increased the power. The international power lines from Morocco also contributed; to alleviate the power cut, Morocco delivered 900 MW of electricity through the Spain-Morocco interconnection that crosses the Strait of Gibraltar from Fardioua to Tarifa, while France sent up to 2 GW of electricity through power lines supplying Catalonia and the Basque Country, and in turn Germany sent power to France. The supply reactivation after the "zero energy" in Spain was accomplished by the Aldeadávila hydroelectric power plant in Salamanca, operated by Iberdrola. This hydroelectric power plant has an autonomous start, which differentiates it from most power plants that need energy to keep producing. Thus, it was possible to reactivate other power plants and substations gradually. By evening, most of the Peninsula had power, and Luis Atienza (former REE president and member of Spain's ruling PSOE) noted the relatively quick repowering of such a large area, in comparison to the days of rotating outages during the 2021 Texas power crisis. In the following days, gas turbines were delivering more power than usual, as their inertia and voltage stability was demanded by the grid operator, but increasing the cost by about 1 eurocent per kWh.

By 07:00 CEST (05:00 UTC) on 29 April, electricity had been restored to 99% of energy demand, and full restoration was achieved by 11:00 CEST (09:00 UTC) that same day. Exports to France also resumed.

=== Portugal ===
Electricity was gradually restored around 17:00 WEST (16:00 UTC) using the two systems that had black start capabilities, the 138 MW Castelo do Bode hydropower dam and the 990 MW natural gas power station Tapada do Outeiro. Around 22:30 WEST (21:30 UTC), power had been restored to half of the population, increasing to 80% by around 00:00 WEST (23:00 UTC). The grid was fully restored in Portugal by early 29 April.

However, Portugal did not allow the resumption of electricity imports from Spain until 8 May, setting a limit of 1 GW to the transmission capacity until 12 May.

== Investigations of potential causes ==
On 9 May 2025, ENTSO-E published a rough timeline of the events leading to the outage, with the cause yet to be determined. ENTSO-E and ACER established an expert panel to investigate the issue, and planned to publish two reports about the event; one about the facts, and the other with the causes and the recommendations.

The power failure was caused by a "surge in voltage that the grid was unable to absorb". A combination of technical, structural, and managerial factors contributed. There were two major fluctuations in the electrical grid, the second of which caused Spain's power system to disconnect from the European system and collapse the Iberian electricity network itself.

On 17 June 2025, the Spanish government released its report pinning the proximate cause of the outage to small outages concentrated in southern Spain setting off a complicated chain reaction. REE did not have sufficient thermal power plants on-line at the time. They "made their calculations and estimated that (switching on more thermal plants) was not necessary at this time. They only set it for the early hours of the day, not the central hours."

REE released its report the following day. At the press release REE Chief of Operations, Concha Sanchez, stated: "Based on our calculation, there were enough voltage control capabilities planned... Had conventional power plants done their job in controlling the voltage there would have been no blackout". Sanchez also said that adding one more natural gas plant to the system would not have made a difference. A representative for the power companies stated that Sanchez comments did reputational damage to the industry and REE "failed to safely cover all the system's needs".

=== Reports by ENTSO-E and ACER ===
The European Network of Transmission System Operators for Electricity (ENTSO-E) and the European Union Agency for the Cooperation of Energy Regulators (ACER) issued a preliminary report analyzing the circumstances of the blackout.

According to the Expert Panel report, "preliminary results indicate that during the half hour preceding the blackout, two periods of oscillations (power and frequency oscillations) were observed" in the affected area: "The first occurred between 12:03 and 12:07. Preliminary analysis of the available information indicates it was a local oscillation, mainly affecting the electrical systems of Spain and Portugal. The second oscillation began between 12:16 and 12:22 and was an inter-area oscillation."

The report includes a timeline stating that around 12:33, "a voltage increase was observed in Spain, which caused a similar rise in Portugal, and frequency decreased [...] Voltage in southern Spain increased drastically, and consequently also in Portugal. The overvoltage triggered a cascade of generation losses that caused a drop in the frequency of the Iberian Peninsula's electrical system." Subsequently, the defense plans "were activated but could not prevent the collapse of the Iberian electrical system," and "the alternating current overhead lines between France and Spain were disconnected by protection devices against loss of synchronism," resulting in "a collapse of all parameters in the Spanish and Portuguese electrical systems, and the HVDC lines between France and Spain ceased transmitting power."

==== Expert Panel report in October 2025 ====
The European Network of Transmission System Operators for Electricity (ENTSO-E) and the European Union Agency for the Cooperation of Energy Regulators (ACER) released a preliminary factual report on the incident on 3 October 2025.

==== Expert Panel Final report ====
On 20 March 2026, the final report of the expert panel of the European Network of Transmission System Operators for Electricity (ENTSO-E) and the European Union Agency for the Cooperation of Energy Regulators (ACER) concluded that:

the blackout resulted from a combination of many interacting factors, including oscillations, gaps in voltage and reactive power control, differences in voltage regulation practices, rapid output reductions and generator disconnections in Spain, and uneven stabilisation capabilities. These factors led to fast increases of voltage and cascading generation disconnections in Spain, resulting in the blackout...

— ENTSO-E, Grid Incident in Spain and Portugal on 28 April 2025 ICS Investigation Expert Panel Final Report, https://www.entsoe.eu/publications/blackout/28-april-2025-iberian-blackout/#Summary

At the press briefing, the Chair of the ENTSO-E Board of Directors, stated: "The problem is not renewable energy, but voltage control, regardless of the type of generation".

The report identified fifteen factors that contributed to the incident. A key factor was that renewable energy power plants were set to follow a fixed-power-control mode. In this configuration, units operating in fixed‑power‑factor mode injected a proportional and rapid reactive‑power ramp, and therefore a corresponding voltage ramp, into the system whenever a fast active‑power change occurred, such as during a schedule adjustment. Furthermore, these units provided no reactive‑power support to compensate for voltage fluctuations, as their reactive‑power output did not respond to the conditions of the grid.

=== Inter-area oscillations ===
In the 30 minutes before the blackout at 12:33:18 CEST, low-frequency oscillations of the frequency were measured (with phasor measurement units) and damped out. The 0.2 Hz oscillations appear to have been between the Iberian Peninsula and the rest of the European wide grid, as they were in opposite grid phase. Two inter-area oscillations appeared from 12:03:15 to 12:07:40 and from 12:19:01 to 12:22:03. The disconnection from the Central European system occurred at 12:33:19 CEST right after the Spanish system lagged more than 90°, causing instability on the transmission lines.

There were also low frequency voltage oscillations and, after the blackout started, continued frequency oscillations were detected. Along with these, systems could have disconnected due to fast ROCOF (rate of change of frequency) above 1.5 Hz/s, which can be stressful on spinning turbines.

Similar oscillations and disconnection happened in December 2016 and July 2021, though with less severe adverse effects. Then, the North-South "ambient" frequency was 0.25 Hz, while now it appears to be lower at 0.217 Hz, likely due to the recent addition of the Baltic states and Ukraine to the Continental Europe Synchronous Area (CESA).

=== Variable renewable energy use ===
The blackout has prompted discussion about how to ensure stability of electricity systems which have a high proportion of variable renewable energy. At the time of the incident, solar energy accounted for approximately 59% of Spain's electricity supply, with wind providing around 12%, nuclear 11%, and gas 5%. The initial fault is believed to have originated in Extremadura, a region that hosts a large proportion of Spain's solar farms, hydroelectric facilities, and the 2 GW Almaraz Nuclear Power Plant, Spain's most powerful nuclear power plant.

==== Inertia ====
In power systems, mechanical inertial response is used to provide stability. In hydropower and thermal power stations, (the latter including fossil-fueled, nuclear and solar thermal) the inertia typically comes from the rotating mass of spinning turbines. A major aspect of transitioning to renewable electricity systems is the reduction in inertia on the grid. Solar, which accounted for the majority of Spain's electricity at the time, uses grid-following inverters for 80% of the solar power supply, which provides little firming to the grid. An energy consultant also pointed to the small amount of controllable inertia, comparing the blackout to the 2016 South Australian blackout, and suggesting the same solutions for Spain as Australia did; synchronous condensers and large batteries.

However, the final report of the Expert Panel declared that "...even with significantly higher inertia values, the loss of system synchronism would not have been avoided, considering the sequence of events". The Chair of the ENTSO-E Board of Directors declared "that a system with greater inertia would have faced the same problem" and "that a central part of the explanation shifts towards voltage behaviour and the system's ability to withstand rapid disturbances, rather than towards simplified interpretations based exclusively on inertia."

=== Isolation ===
REE and experts at Montel Analytics pointed to the relative isolation of the Iberian grid as a contributing factor to the blackout, as neighbouring grids were less able to provide stability.

=== Cyberattack ===
Spain's National Cybersecurity Institute was reported to be investigating the possibility that a cyberattack caused the incident. Initial reports are mixed on the likelihood of the cause being a cyberattack, with several government officials ruling it out, and The Wall Street Journal claiming that "the outages bear hallmarks of a sophisticated cyberattack on the region's power grid" that fit a pattern of increased cyberattacks in Europe. A thorough forensic analysis was estimated to take one to three weeks.

On the morning of 29 April, REE attributed the outage to a disconnection of the grid in the south-west of Spain. The institution ruled out a cyberattack as the cause of the blackout and announced that it was investigating the cause of the disconnection.

Citizens must know that the government will get to the bottom of this. Measures will be taken, and all private operators will be held accountable. To this end, the Spanish government has concluded a commission of inquiry led by the Ministry for Ecological Transition.

— Pedro Sánchez, Prime Minister of Spain

Audiencia Nacional judge José Luis Calama initiated preliminary investigations to determine whether the national outage could have been an act of sabotage against critical Spanish infrastructure, which, according to newspaper Vozpópuli, would be considered an act of terrorism.

According to El Mundo, Spain's Secretary of State for Foreign Affairs, Diego Martínez Belío, discarded the possibility that the blackout was the result of a cyberattack during his bilateral meetings with the US administration in Washington, D.C. Meanwhile, this possibility was officially kept open in Spain.

In June 2025, a report was published by an expert committee which analysed the electricity crisis, approved and published by the National Security Council. Sara Aagesen, Third Deputy Prime Minister and Minister for the Ecological Transition of Spain, stated that "the largest cybersecurity investigation that has ever taken place in our country" confirmed that "there is no evidence of cyber-incident or cyber-attack as the cause of the energy crisis, neither at the operator nor at the different levels."

=== Technological Research Institute report ===
In September 2025, a report by the Institute of Technological Research (IIT) at the Pontifical Comillas University concluded that the primary cause of the blackout in the electricity system of the Iberian Peninsula was insufficient dispatch of synchronous generation with dynamic voltage control, combined with the limited resilience of the electricity transmission network.

The report, prepared by Dr Luis Rouco, Dr Enrique Lobato, and Dr Francisco M. Echavarren, was peer-reviewed in line with scientific community standards, and endorsed by Professor Göran Andersson, Emeritus at Swiss Federal Institute of Technology, Zurich, and Professor Pier Luigi Mancarella of the University of Melbourne and University of Manchester.

The report questions the operational decisions of Red Eléctrica de España and identifies several underlying causes of the outage in Spain: voltage instability in the days leading up to and during the morning of 28 April; insufficient synchronous generation; the fragile state of the transmission network at that time; and an inadequate security margin to prevent collapse due to overvoltage. The document has been forwarded to ENTSO-E.

=== Senate Inquiry Committee ===
On 12 June 2025, the "Committee of Inquiry into the Interruption of Electricity and Communications Supply on 28 April 2025" was established under the 15th Parliamentary Term of the Spanish Senate, with the aim of analysing the technical, operational and organisational causes that led to the blackout, and assessing the actions of the Government, Red Eléctrica de España (REE), and other entities involved (including operators, electricity companies, and regulators).

Since 23 July 2025, hearings have been held in accordance with a previously approved work plan, featuring a list of witnesses proposed by the various parliamentary groups represented on the Committee. Energy experts and senior business figures have participated, among them Beatriz Corredor, Chair of Redeia, whose appearance was requested jointly by PSOE, PP, and Vox.

The first hearing was given by Professor José Manuel Clamagirand García, Director of Water and Environment at Sener, who highlighted the lack of planning in addressing voltage stability issues and the insufficient technical oversight that ought to have been exercised by Red Eléctrica, arguing that other reversible energy sources, such as hydroelectric power, should have been deployed on that day.

On 4 September 2025, Mr Jorge Antonio González Sánchez, Director of Energy and Projects at Losán, and Mr Fernando Ley Llano, an industrial engineer, appeared before the Committee. During the same hearing, reference was made to Mr Ley Llano's earlier participation on 11 March 2025 before the Congress of Deputies in the Committee on the Draft Industry and Strategic Autonomy Bill, where he had already warned of Spain's energy shortcomings, specifically, the mismanagement of the decarbonisation process and REE's limitations in handling the necessary energy load in the absence of nuclear generation, which, he cautioned, could lead to a blackout.

On 18 September 2025, Mrs Marta Castro Pérez-Chirinos, Director of Regulation at the Association of Electricity Companies (AELEC), testified that Red Eléctrica bore sole responsibility for the incident owing to its failure to anticipate synchronous capacity requirements within the system, which resulted in the nationwide blackout. According to her statement, voltage surges had already been observed in the transmission grid on 16, 22, and 24 April 2025, occurrences that should have prompted preventive measures.

On 25 September 2025, Dr Manuel Fernández Ordóñez, Doctor in Nuclear Physics, also attributed responsibility to Red Eléctrica, citing its regulation of voltages that led to the widespread surge. He argued that the crisis was not the result of the increasing share of solar and wind energy, but stemmed from structural and regulatory deficiencies in Spain's electricity network, compounded by operational decisions made by REE.

Finally, on 23 October, Mr Manuel García Hernández, Director for Energy and Mining Policy, appeared before the Senate. In his statement, he asserted that Red Eléctrica had not notified the Ministry for the Ecological Transition of any potential risk of disruption to the electricity supply in the days preceding the blackout. However, on 22 April voltage variations were recorded which, according to the system operator, are common in isolation but rare when occurring simultaneously, and which led to localised disconnections. He also contradicted Red Eléctrica, stating that the Ministry had not instructed it to implement reinforced operation, a status under which it has been operating since 28 April.

== Misinformation and early speculation ==
=== Cyberattack ===
Several false and misleading claims were circulated regarding the origins of the power cut. Messages were spread online (at 12:56, 23 minutes after the blackout) claiming that it was caused by a Russian cyberattack, falsely attributed to CNN International and European Commission president Ursula von der Leyen. It was also falsely attributed to the Portuguese electricity company EDP Group.

=== Putative atmospheric event ===
Some media outlets, including CNN and Reuters, reported that REN claimed it was because of a supposed "rare atmospheric event" called "induced atmospheric vibration", causing "synchronization failures between the electrical systems". REN has denied releasing either of these statements. A claim of solar flare received 1.9 million views, and was rejected by the Space Weather Prediction Center. Several false satellite photos showing a blacked out peninsula at night were also spread.

=== Reports of experiment ===
According to anonymous sources cited by Telegraph business editor Ambrose Evans-Pritchard, Spanish "authorities" were conducting an experiment in preparation for the 2027 nuclear phase-out. Evans-Pritchard compared it to the Chernobyl disaster.

Diana Morant, Minister of Science and Innovation, said the reports of an experiment prior to the crash were a hoax. Spain's First Deputy Prime Minister, María Jesús Montero, also denied the reports of the experiment and attributed this information to a business interest group. A week later, Euronews fact checked the claim, with experts stating the theory doesn't seem reasonable.

=== Political perspectives ===
Some political groups, including the Spanish far-right Vox party, attributed the blackout to over-reliance on renewables and called for a more diversified energy mix. An energy analyst at Rystad Energy, Pratheeksha Ramdas, said that greater amounts of renewables in the power system may have made the grid susceptible to outages, but that there are multiple possible causes of the disturbance. Henning Gloystein, director for energy at the Eurasia Group research firm, said it might have been easier to keep the system functioning if conventional energy sources like oil and gas had a larger presence.

However, several officials and energy experts have rejected the idea that renewables are to blame. EU energy commissioner, Dan Jørgensen, stated that there was "nothing unusual" about the electricity mix at the time of the blackout, and that the outage was not due to a "specific source energy". Daniel Muir, a European power analyst at S&P Global, said the nature and scale of the outage makes renewable energy an unlikely cause. Spain's Environment Minister, Sara Aagesen, emphasised that the system had operated reliably under similar demand and energy mixes in the past, and Beatriz Corredor, president of REE and member of Spain's ruling party, said that it was inaccurate to attribute the blackout to Spain's growing use of renewable energy. At a press conference on 29 April, Prime Minister Pedro Sánchez dismissed allegations that renewable energy caused the power cut, calling them "lies" and criticising those who blamed the blackout on Spain's reliance on wind and solar power.

== Human casualties ==
- In Spain:
  - In Alzira, Valencia, a 46-year-old woman who depended on an oxygen machine died.
  - In Catalonia, 25 people were harmed by malfunctioning generators or misuse of them.
  - In Madrid, at Carabanchel neighbourhood, a woman died in a fire caused by a candle. The fire trapped several people in a building. Several people were harmed in that same event.
  - In Taboadela, Ourense, a couple and their son died of carbon monoxide inhalation due to a generator being used indoors. One of the couple required a mechanical ventilator, which prompted the use of the generator.
- In Portugal, a 77-year-old died after a mechanical ventilator stopped working in her home in Agualva-Cacém.

== Reactions ==
European Commission president Ursula von der Leyen spoke with Pedro Sánchez and posted a statement on social media platform X (formerly Twitter): "I reaffirmed the European Commission's support in monitoring the situation with national and European authorities and our Electricity Coordination Group. We will coordinate efforts and share information to help restore the electricity system, and agreed to stay in close contact."

Ukrainian president Volodymyr Zelenskyy, after speaking with Sánchez, offered his country's assistance based on the experience it has gained throughout the targeting of its electrical infrastructure in the Russian invasion of Ukraine.

== Responses ==
The government of Spain approved Royal Decree-Law 7/2025 on 24 June 2025 as a response to the blackout which focused on electricity storage, procedures, demand participation, plant operation, electricity intensive industries, and electricity grids. It was later repealed in July 2025 by the Spanish parliament. By April 2026, Spain had 193 MW of grid batteries, and 339 MWh of home batteries, with more in projects.

In July 2025, Portugal announced €400 million of investment in its electricity grid as a response to the blackout, with 31 actions. This includes increasing grid battery power from less than 20 MW to 750 MW, doubling the number of black start power stations from 2 to 4 by upgrading the aforementioned Alqueva Dam and Baixo Sabor Dam (enabling Portugal to restart its grid independently of Spain), and increasing resilience for critical facilities. A further €137 million is for grid control. The programs are to be funded by a 1% increase in energy bills. In Portugal, 60 MW of grid-forming batteries are under construction.

== See also ==
- List of largest power outages
- 2024 CrowdStrike-related IT outages
- 2025 AWS outage
- 2025 Brazil blackout

== Sources ==
- "Versión no confidencial del informe del comité para el análisis de las circunstancias que concurrieron en la crisis de electricidad del 28 de abril de 2025" [Non-confidential version of the report of the committee for the analysis of the circumstances surrounding the electricity crisis of April 28, 2025] (PDF). Government of Spain (in Spanish). Committee for the analysis of the circumstances of the electricity crisis of April 28, 2025. 2025a.
- "Non-confidential version of the report of the committee for the analysis of the circumstances surrounding the electricity crisis of April 28, 2025". Government of Spain. Committee for the analysis of the circumstances of the electricity crisis of April 28, 2025. 2025b.
- "Blackout in the Spanish Peninsular Electrical System the 28th of April 2025" (PDF). Red Eléctrica de España. June 2025.
- Denholm, Paul; Mai, Trieu; Kenyon, Rick Wallace; Kroposki, Ben; O'Malley, Mark (2020). Inertia and the Power Grid: A Guide Without the Spin (PDF). National Renewable Energy Laboratory.
