= Unconventional source =

Unconventional source may refer to:

- Unconventional (oil and gas) reservoir, a source of oil
- Unconventional source of electricity, an electrical generator that behaves differently than a synchronous one
