= Overcurrent =

Dangerous condition in electrical systems

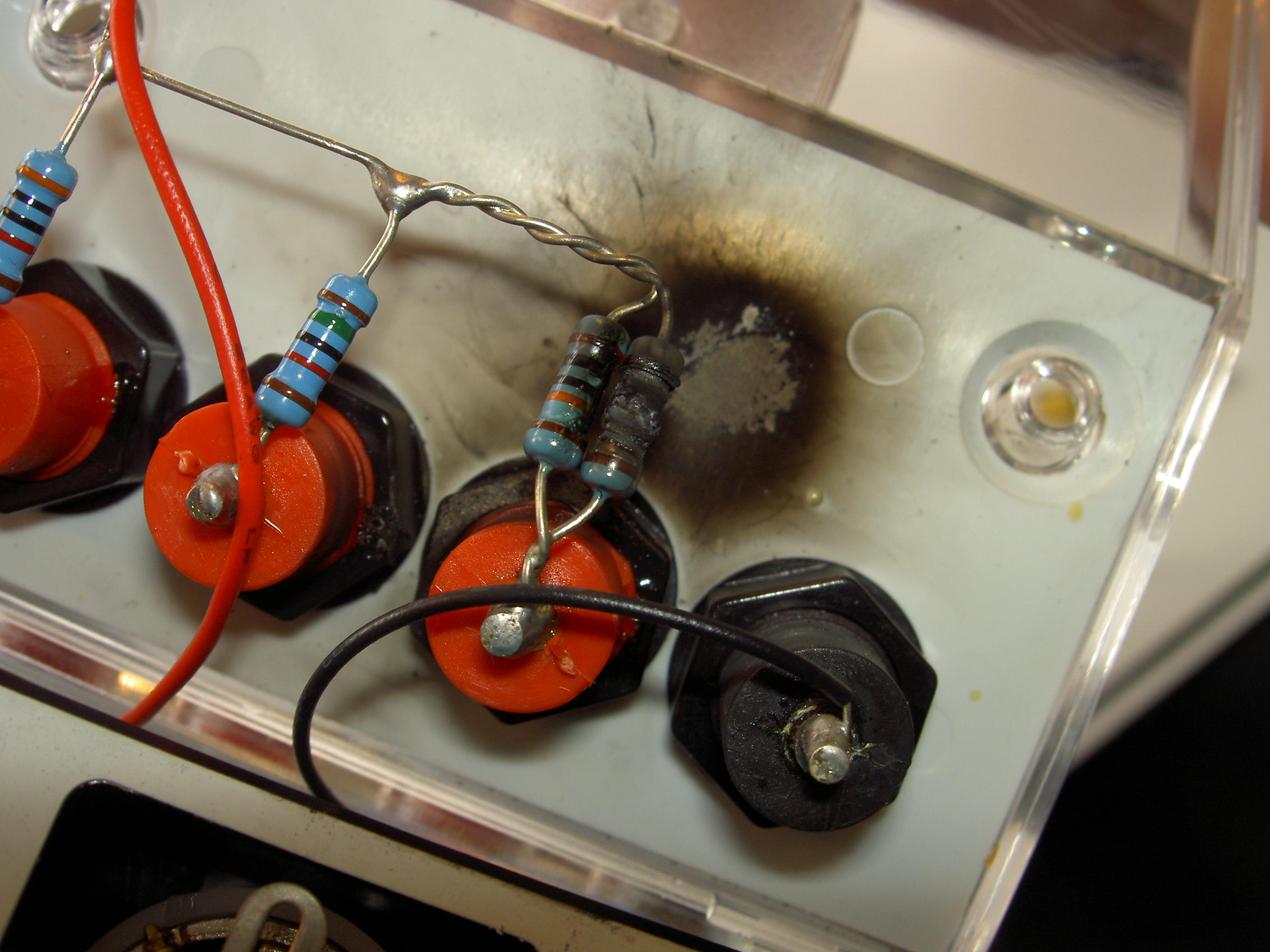
The inside of a voltmeter in which at least one of its resistors has burned out due to an overcurrent caused by exposing the voltmeter to a voltage (230 V) higher than the maximum expected (30 V)

In an electric power system, overcurrent or excess current is a situation where a larger than intended electric current exists through a conductor, leading to excessive generation of heat, and the risk of fire or damage to equipment. Possible causes for overcurrent include short circuits, excessive load, incorrect design, an arc fault, or a ground fault. Fuses, circuit breakers, and current limiters are commonly used overcurrent protection (OCP) mechanisms to control the risks. Circuit breakers, relays, and fuses protect circuit wiring from damage caused by overcurrent.

== Overcurrent in an electrical grid ==
Overcurrent capabilities of electrical generators are essential for the power system operations. Lack of overcurrent capability (low short circuit ratio) of a weak grid creates a multitude of problems, including:

- transients during the large load changes will cause large variations of the grid voltage, causing problems with the loads (e.g., some motors might not be able to start in the undervoltage condition);
- the grid protection devices are designed to be triggered by a sufficient level of overcurrent. In a weak system the short circuit current might be hard to distinguish from a normal transient overcurrent encountered during the load changes;
- during a black start operation after a failure, large inrush current might be needed to energize the system components. For example, if some loads in a weak system remain connected, and inverter-based resource might not be able to start.

== Related standards ==
- IEC 60364-4-43: Electrical installations of buildings – Part 4-43: Protection for safety – Protection against overcurrent

== See also ==
- Current limiting
- Electrical fault
- Electrical safety testing
- Overvoltage

== Sources ==
- Li, Haiguo; Nie, Cheng; Wang, Fred (2022). "Grid Strengthening IBR: An Inverter-Based Resource Enhanced by a Co-Located Synchronous Condenser for High Overcurrent Capability". IEEE Open Journal of Power Electronics. 3. Institute of Electrical and Electronics Engineers (IEEE): 535–548. doi:10.1109/ojpel.2022.3194849. ISSN 2644-1314. S2CID 251194445.
