= Short circuit ratio (electrical grid) =

Term in electrical engineering

In an electrical grid, the short circuit ratio (or SCR) is the ratio of: the short circuit apparent power (SCMVA) in the case of a line-line-line-ground (3LG) fault at the location in the grid where some generator is connected, to: the power rating of the generator itself (GMW).

Since the power that can be delivered by the grid varies by location, frequently a location is indicated, for example, at the point of interconnection (POI):

$$SCR_{POI} = \frac {SCMVA_{POI}} {GMW}$$

SCR is used to quantify the system strength of the grid (its ability to deal with changes in active and reactive power injection and consumption). On a simplified level, a high SCR indicates that the particular generator represents a small portion of the power available at the point of its connection to the grid, and therefore the generator problems cannot affect the grid in a significant way. SCMVA is defined as a product of the voltage before the 3LG fault and the current that would flow after the fault (this worst-case combination will not happen in practice, but provides a useful estimation of the capacity of the circuit). SCMVA is also called a short circuit level (SCL), although sometimes the term SCL is used to designate just the short-circuit current.

== Grid strength ==
The term grid strength (also system strength) is used to describe the resiliency of the grid to the small changes in the vicinity of the grid location ("grid stiffness"). From the side of an electrical generator, the system strength is related to the changes of voltage the generator encounters on its terminals as the generator's current injection varies. Therefore, the quantification of the system strength can be done through finding the equivalent (Thévenin) electrical impedance of the system as observed from these terminals (the strength is inversely proportional to the resistance). SCR and its variations provide a convenient way to calculate this impedance under normal or contingency conditions (these estimates are not intended for the actual short-circuit state).

Strong grids provide a reliable reference for power sources to synchronize. In a very stiff system the voltage does not change with variations of the power injected by a particular generator, making its control simpler. In a traditional grid dominated by synchronous generators, a strong grid with SCR greater than 3.0 will have the desired voltage stability and active power reserves. A weak grid (with SCR values between 2.0 and 3.0) can exhibit voltage instability and control problems. A grid with SCR below 2.0 is very weak.

=== Importance of overcurrent ===
Grid strength is also important for its overcurrent capabilities that are essential for the power system operations. Lack of overcurrent capability (low SCR) in a weak grid creates a multitude of problems, including:

- transients during the large load changes will cause large variations of the grid voltage, causing problems with the loads (e.g., some motors might not be able to start in the undervoltage condition);
- the grid protection devices are designed to be triggered by a sufficient level of overcurrent. In a weak system the short circuit current might be hard to distinguish from a normal transient overcurrent encountered during the load changes;
- during a black start operation after a power outage, large inrush current might be needed to energize the system components. For example, if some loads in a weak system remain connected, an inverter-based resource might not be able to start.

=== Presence of inverter-based resources ===
Large penetration of the inverter-based resources (IBRs) reduces the short circuit level: a typical synchronous generator can deliver a significant overcurrent, 2-5 p.u., for a relatively long time (minutes), while the component limitations of the IBRs result in overcurrent limits of less than 2 p.u. (usually 1.1-1.2 p.u.).

The original SCR definition above was intended for a system with predominantly synchronous generation, so multiple alternative metrics, including weighted short circuit ratio (WSCR), composite short circuit ratio (CSCR), equivalent circuit short circuit ratio (ESCR), and short circuit ratio with interaction factors (SCRIF), have been proposed for the grids with multiple adjacent IBRs to avoid an overestimation of the grid strength (an IBR relies on grid strength to synchronize its operation and does not have much overcurrent capacity).

Henderson et al. argue that in case of IBRs the SCR and system strength are in fact decoupled and propose a new metric, grid strength impedance.

As renewable energy penetration grows, system strength becomes a key concern because it determines how sensitive grid variables such as voltage are to disturbances. Low SCR values indicate that a connected device is large relative to the available fault current, increasing the risk of voltage instability.

Power electronic applications such as HVDC and FACTS devices face particular challenges when connected to weak portions of the grid. Current source converter-based HVDC systems, for example, may require alternative converter topologies—such as voltage-source converters or capacitor-commutated converters—when SCR values approach unity. Without such measures, low SCR conditions can lead to excessive overvoltages, low-frequency resonances, and control system instability.

Wind farms are frequently sited in areas with weaker grid connections, remote from major load centres. Integrating large amounts of wind generation into these locations can create voltage stability challenges. Turbine manufacturers may specify minimum SCR requirements for standard controller settings; operation in lower-SCR environments can require additional analysis, retuning of controls, or the installation of dynamic reactive compensation equipment such as STATCOMs.

==== Example ====
An incident at ERCOT in the early 21st century illustrates the practical consequences of weak grid conditions for wind generation. A wind power plant (WPP) connected via two 69 kV transmission lines operated normally when both lines were in service, corresponding to an SCR of approximately 4. When one line was taken out of service, the SCR fell to around 2 or below, and phasor measurement units at the POI recorded sustained voltage oscillations. Investigation revealed that the plant's voltage controller, tuned for stronger grid conditions, had excessive gain for the reduced-SCR environment: the controller responded too aggressively to voltage deviations that were themselves amplified by the higher grid impedance, creating a destabilising feedback loop. The event was subsequently replicated in dynamic simulation.

== Impact on grid ==
The SCR can be calculated for each point on an electrical grid. A grid with high SCR is known as a strong grid or power system. A power system (grid) having a low SCR has more vulnerability to grid voltage instability. Hence such a grid or system is known as a weak grid or a weak power system.

Grid strength can be increased by installing synchronous condensers. Condenser can act as a synchronous voltage source to support transient reactance and sub-transient reactance, also providing the inertial response and fault current contribution.

Static synchronous compensators may also be used to improve the SCR ratio, being the current source limited by storage discharge and thermal condition.

== Sources ==
- Kundur, P.; Balu, N.J.; Lauby, M.G. (1994). Power System Stability and Control. EPRI power system engineering series. McGraw-Hill Education. ISBN 978-0-07-035958-1.
- NERC (February 2018). Short-Circuit Modeling and System Strength (PDF). Atlanta, GA.
- NERC (December 2017). Integrating Inverter-Based Resources into Low Short Circuit Strength Systems (PDF). Atlanta, GA.
- Henderson, Callum; Egea-Alvarez, Agusti; Kneuppel, Thyge; Yang, Guangya; Xu, Lie (2023). "Grid Strength Impedance Metric: An Alternative to SCR for Evaluating System Strength in Converter Dominated Systems" (PDF). IEEE Transactions on Power Delivery. 39. Institute of Electrical and Electronics Engineers (IEEE): 386–396. doi:10.1109/tpwrd.2022.3233455. ISSN 0885-8977. S2CID 255660560.
- Burton, T.; Sharpe, D.; Jenkins, N.; Bossanyi, E. (2001). Wind Energy Handbook. John Wiley & Sons. ISBN 978-0-471-48997-9.
- Zhang, Yang; Huang, Shun-Hsien Fred; Schmall, John; Conto, Jose; Billo, Jeffrey; Rehman, Ehsan (2014). "Evaluating system strength for large-scale wind plant integration". 2014 IEEE PES General Meeting | Conference & Exposition. IEEE. pp. 1–5. doi:10.1109/pesgm.2014.6939043. ISBN 978-1-4799-6415-4.
- Li, Haiguo; Nie, Cheng; Wang, Fred (2022). "Grid Strengthening IBR: An Inverter-Based Resource Enhanced by a Co-Located Synchronous Condenser for High Overcurrent Capability". IEEE Open Journal of Power Electronics. 3. Institute of Electrical and Electronics Engineers (IEEE): 535–548. Bibcode:2022IOJPE...3..535L. doi:10.1109/ojpel.2022.3194849. ISSN 2644-1314. S2CID 251194445.
- Ramasubramanian, Deepak (November 8, 2019). "Challenges and Possible Solutions for the Power System of the Future" (PDF). cigre-usnc.org. CIGRE.
