= Subcycle overvoltage =

The subcycle overvoltage condition describes the electrical generation fault mode that is associated with the inverter-based resources (IBR, like solar photovoltaics and wind turbines) and can cause a massive and instantaneous loss of electricity generation. When the overvoltage condition is detected, the IBR devices self-protect by disconnecting from the grid and can only come back online once the voltage returns to the design limits. In the meantime, a cascading failure can be triggered due to lack of generation capacity that remains online.

The typical fault scenario is two-stage:

1. A line-to-ground or line-to-line fault occurs on a transmission line far away from the generator. This condition, if short-lived, is not very unusual. The inverter electronics cannot tolerate the resulting low-voltage condition and enters the "momentary cessation" (MC) mode where the unit stops providing the power but remains connected to the grid;
2. Once the fault clears, the line voltage might briefly reach very high level, exceeding the 1.3 pu that was required by older design specifications (in 2022, per IEEE 2800-2022, the tolerance was upped to 1.8 pu). Due to the overvoltage, the IBR disconnects ("trips") and can only join the grid once the power line conditions become normal again.

The problem was accidentally exacerbated by a requirement to have a shunt capacitor across the connection terminals of an IBR. This feature was expected to provide the reactive power support to the grid (the typical inverter is designed for a unity power factor), yet after a short remote line fault it increased the overvoltage at the generator connection and contributed to the problem (the later designs followed the IEEE 1547-2018 standard and did not use the shunt capacitors in the MC mode). As a result, solar and wind farms with older inverter modules had exhibited multiple farm-wide disconnections that were almost-instantaneous (quarter of the AC cycle). For example, in 2017 the Canyon Fire 2 incident took out 900 MW of solar capacity.

== Sources ==
- Fan, Lingling; Miao, Zhixin (2022). "The cause of sub-cycle overvoltage: Capacitive characteristics of solar PVs". Electric Power Systems Research. 209 108039. Bibcode:2022EPSR..20908039F. doi:10.1016/j.epsr.2022.108039.
- Hossain, Shah Mohazzem; Patel, Trupal; Brahma, Sukumar (2024). "Resolving Sub-Cycle Overvoltage Issue in Solar and Type-4 Wind Farms Employing Low Voltage Ride Through". IEEE Access. 12: 175627–175639. Bibcode:2024IEEEA..12q5627H. doi:10.1109/ACCESS.2024.3504547. ISSN 2169-3536.
