= Grid oscillation =

Oscillations in an electric grid

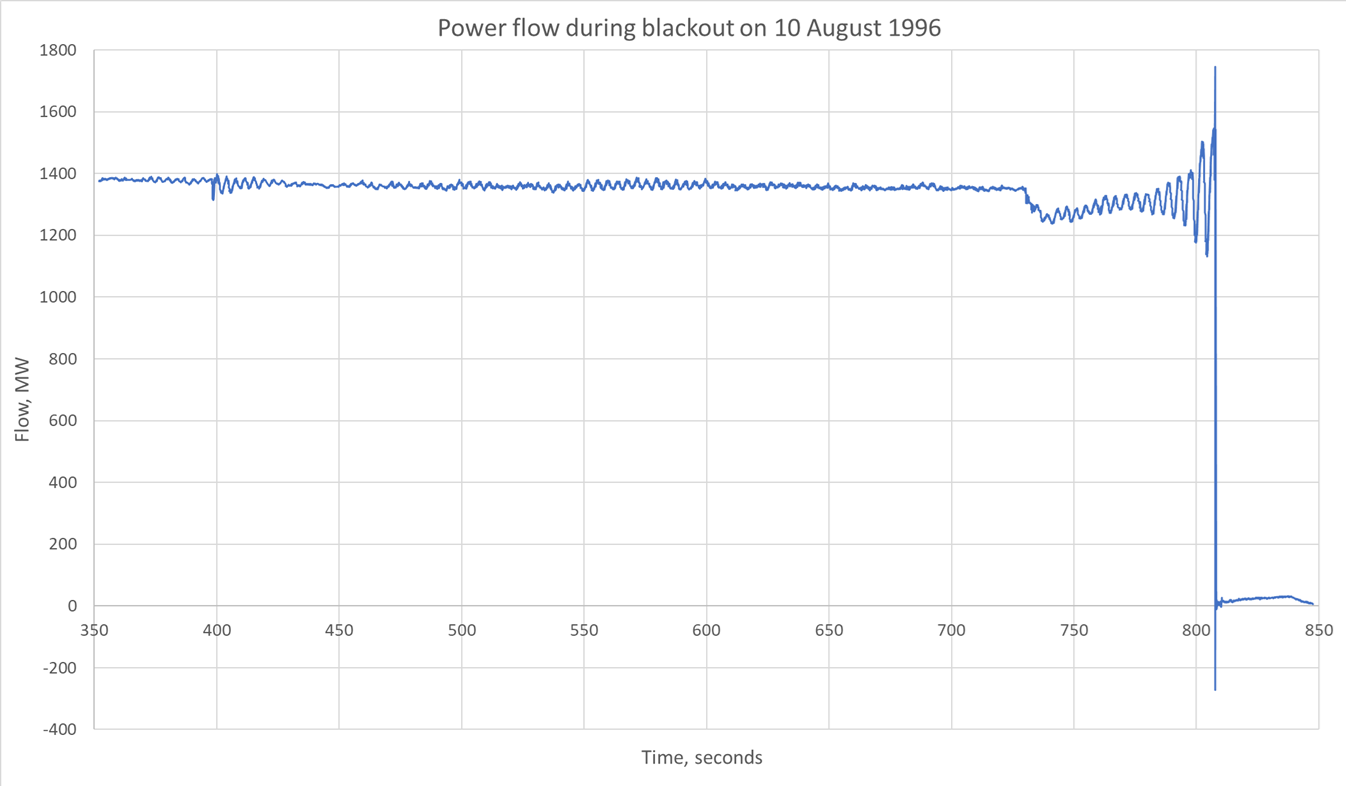
Oscillation on the graph of a power flow of one transmission line during the 10 August 1996 blackout. Undamped oscillations around the 750 second mark lead to system collapse, while a similar oscillation triggered around the 400 second mark decayed as it should under normal conditions.

Grid oscillations are oscillations in an electrical grid manifesting themselves in low-frequency (mostly below 1 Hz) periodic changes of power flow. These oscillations are a natural effect of negative feedback in power system control algorithms. During normal operation of the power grid, these oscillations, triggered by some change in the system, decay with time (are "damped"), and are mostly not noticeable. If the damping in the system is not sufficient, the amplitude of oscillations can grow, leading to a blackout.

For example, shortly before the 1996 Western North America blackouts, the grid was oscillating with a frequency of 0.26 Hz for about 30 seconds after each disturbance. At some point a sequence of faults and opening of automatic protection relays caused loss of damping, eventually breaking the system into disconnected "islands" with many customers losing power. The other notable events involving oscillations were the Northeast blackout of 2003 and the 2009 sub-synchronous oscillations in Texas.

While the theory and calculations tools for analyzing oscillations are available, pinpointing the source of instability in a real grid is frequently difficult as of the early 2020s. The oscillations are a normal occurrence, yet the difference in a flow as small as 10 MW is known to occasionally push the system from the stable mode with decaying oscillations into a situation where their amplitudes grow with time. The system operator frequently gets no warning that the grid is close to its damping limit.

== Underdamping ==
The primary cause of the oscillations is insufficient damping. The following conditions typically lead to weak damping:

- high power transmission over long distances;
- high-power networks interconnected by weak tie lines;
- fast-feedback automatic voltage control.

High penetration of inverter-based resources exacerbated grid stability issues, including the oscillations (in addition to subcycle overvoltage and AC overcurrent). In some cases, high frequency oscillations (hundreds of Hz) were also observed. The oscillations can also occur due to the design of control loops of high-voltage direct current links (HVDC) and static var compensators (SVC).

== Terminology ==
The North American Electric Reliability Corporation suggests the following classifications for grid oscillations:

- System (Natural): low-frequency changes in the rotor angle triggered by power imbalance:
  - Local: oscillations of one generator or a group of them (intra-plant) within a power plant, caused by heavy load interacting with the generator control, unit control interactions, and poor control settings (1 Hz to several Hz)
  - Inter-area: oscillations between few coherent parts of the system due to weak inter-area tie lines (0.1–1.00 Hz)
  - Torsional: oscillations with relatively high frequency (but still below line frequency, "subsynchronous") due to a resonance between transmission lines with high level of voltage compensation and the mechanical resonances of turbine generators (also known as subsynchronous resonance, 5.00–50.00 Hz). These oscillations can cause mechanical damage to the synchronous generators. Some authors call all below-line-frequency oscillations "subsynchronous".
- Forced: oscillations due to externally injected forces, like faulty equipment.

A grid oscillation can also be "multimode", a result of interplaying underdamped oscillation modes.

== History ==
The oscillations are inherent in a synchronous electrical power system. Oversimplified, a synchronous generator behaves like a pendulum, with synchronizing torque playing the role of gravity by pulling the machine into synchronicity, and the inertia of the rotor causing the generator to overshoot the ideal synchronized rotor angle (cf. Hunting oscillation). Oscillations were observed once multiple generators were connected in parallel to increase power and reliability. At the time, the involved generators were located close together, the oscillation frequencies were on the order of 1-2 Hz, and a damper winding was added to the generator design in order to absorb the energy of oscillations. Early research started in the late 1930s.

As power systems grew in size, rapid automatic voltage control was introduced. The fast feedback of these systems had a side effect of lower damping, so power system stabilizers (PSS) were added to damp the oscillations. In the 1950s and 1960s, the electric power industry consolidated the grids into larger and larger ones for reliability and savings of scale. However, low-frequency oscillations became a major issue, and some attempted interconnections were actually abandoned until asynchronous means of connecting systems arrived in the form of HVDC links. The first report of a low-frequency grid oscillation is from October 1964 during a trial attempt to connect the Northwest Power Pool and Southwest Power Pool. Tie line oscillations of 0.1 Hz were observed.

Wide penetration of inverter-based resources in the 21st century made high frequency (hundreds of Hz) oscillations possible. Offshore wind power plants in particular exhibited oscillations of up to 800 Hz caused by a resonance between the plant and the power cable.

== Sources ==
- Cheng, Yunzhi; Fan, Lingling; Rose, Jonathan; Huang, Shun-Hsien; Schmall, John; Wang, Xiaoyu; Xie, Xiaorong; Shair, Jan; Ramamurthy, Jayanth R.; Modi, Nilesh; Li, Chun; Wang, Chen; Shah, Shahil; Pal, Bikash; Miao, Zhixin; Isaacs, Andrew; Mahseredjian, Jean; Zhou, Jenny (2023). "Real-World Subsynchronous Oscillation Events in Power Grids With High Penetrations of Inverter-Based Resources". IEEE Transactions on Power Systems. 38 (1): 316–330. Bibcode:2023ITPSy..38..316C. doi:10.1109/TPWRS.2022.3161418. ISSN 0885-8950. OSTI 1862948.
- Concordia, C.; Carter, G. K. (1941). "Negative Damping of Electrical Machinery". Transactions of the American Institute of Electrical Engineers. 60 (3): 116–119. doi:10.1109/T-AIEE.1941.5058292. ISSN 0096-3860.
- Hatziargyriou, Nikos; Milanovic, Jovica; Rahmann, Claudia; Ajjarapu, Venkataramana; Canizares, Claudio; Erlich, Istvan; Hill, David; Hiskens, Ian; Kamwa, Innocent; Pal, Bikash; Pourbeik, Pouyan; Sanchez-Gasca, Juan; Stankovic, Aleksandar; Van Cutsem, Thierry; Vittal, Vijay; Vournas, Costas (2021). "Definition and Classification of Power System Stability – Revisited & Extended" (PDF). IEEE Transactions on Power Systems. 36 (4): 3271–3281. Bibcode:2021ITPSy..36.3271H. doi:10.1109/TPWRS.2020.3041774. ISSN 0885-8950.
- "Terms, Definitions and Symbols for Subsynchronous Oscillations". IEEE Transactions on Power Apparatus and Systems. PAS-104 (6): 1326–1334. 1985. Bibcode:1985ITPAS.104.1326.. doi:10.1109/TPAS.1985.319152. ISSN 0018-9510.
- "Reader's guide to subsynchronous resonance". IEEE Transactions on Power Systems. 7 (1): 150–157. 1992. Bibcode:1992ITPSy...7..150.. doi:10.1109/59.141698.
- NERC (September 2017). "Reliability Guideline: Forced Oscillation Monitoring & Mitigation" (PDF). Archived from the original (PDF) on 5 June 2022.
- Rogers, Graham; Elliott, Ryan T.; Trudnowski, Daniel J.; Wilches-Bernal, Felipe; Osipov, Denis; Chow, Joe H. (2025-02-03). Power System Oscillations: An Introduction to Oscillation Analysis and Control. Springer Nature. ISBN 978-3-031-80581-3.
- Wang, Bin (May 13, 2021). Demystifying Power System Oscillations – Recent and Ongoing Efforts (PDF). 2021 Joint Synchronized Information Subcommittee (JSIS) Meeting. Grid Planning and Analysis Center, National Renewable Energy Laboratory (NREL).
- Wang, Haifeng; Du, Wenjuan (2016). Analysis and Damping Control of Power System Low-frequency Oscillations. Boston, MA: Springer US. doi:10.1007/978-1-4899-7696-3. ISBN 978-1-4899-7694-9.
