= Canyon Fire 2 =

2017 wildfire in Southern California

- Date: October 9, 2017 –; October 17, 2017
- Location: Anaheim, California, U.S.
- Coordinates: 33.87041°N 117.70975°W

Statistics
- Burned area: 9,217 acres (14.402 sq mi)
- Land use: Residential; Open space

Impacts
- Injuries: 3 civilians
- Structures lost: 25 homes

Ignition
- Cause: Embers from the previous Canyon Fire

Map
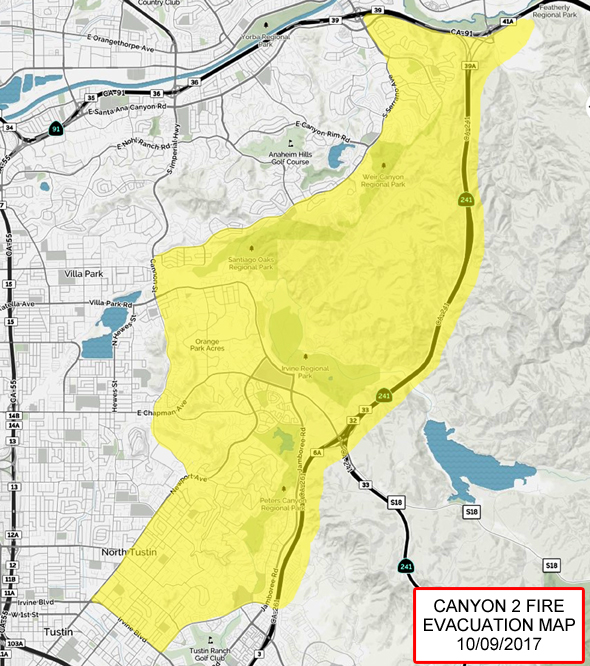

- Location of fire in California

The Canyon Fire 2, also known as the Canyon 2 Fire, was a wildfire that burned in the Anaheim Hills area of the city of Anaheim in Orange County, California. The fast-moving brush fire broke out on October 9, 2017, around 9:45 A.M. PDT near the 91 Freeway and Gypsum Canyon Road. It leaped over the Route 241 toll road, raced up a ridge, and set fire to several homes. In total, about 16,570 were ordered to evacuate their homes in Anaheim, Orange, and Tustin but returned when the evacuation order was lifted on October 12.

By noon on the day the fire began, it had burned 800 acres (1.3 sq mi). By 2:30, fueled by high winds and low humidity, it had burned 2,000 acres (3.1 sq mi) and was 0 percent contained. As of 6:00 a.m. October 10 it had burned 7,500 acres (11.7 sq mi) and at least 24 structures had been damaged and a dozen homes destroyed.

On October 15, the fire was reportedly 90 percent contained. A total of 9,217 acres (14.402 sq mi) had been burned, with 25 structures destroyed and another 55 damaged.

Canyon Fire 2 was declared 100% contained on October 17, 2017, at 5:57 A.M. PDT. The acreage burned was 9,217. 25 structures were destroyed and 55 were damaged.

An earlier fire near the border between Anaheim and Corona in late September had been called the Canyon Fire, leading to the designation of this one as Canyon Fire 2. That first fire burned approximately 2,600 acres (4.1 sq mi) but did not cause any property damage. Authorities believe the embers from the first fire and the strong winds most likely caused the second fire.

The fire is also known for its effect on the electric grid: the incident took out about 900 MW of solar capacity near-instantaneously due to the subcycle overvoltage fault.

== See also ==
- 2017 California wildfires
- 2018 Southern California mudflows

== Sources ==
- Fan, Lingling; Miao, Zhixin (2022). "The cause of sub-cycle overvoltage: Capacitive characteristics of solar PVs". Electric Power Systems Research. 209 108039. Bibcode:2022EPSR..20908039F. doi:10.1016/j.epsr.2022.108039.
