= Black start =

Restoring of electric power station without external electric power

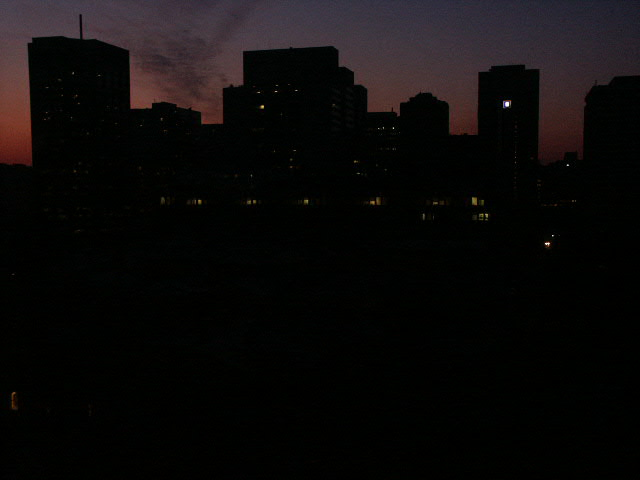
Toronto during the Northeast blackout of 2003, which required black-starting of generating stations

A black start is the process of restoring an electric power station, a part of an electric grid or an industrial plant, to operation without relying on the external electric power transmission network to recover from a total or partial shutdown.

Power to restart a generating station or plant may come from an on-site black start standby generator. Alternatively, where a large amount of power is required, a tie-line to another generating plant or to an emergency generator may be used to start the facility. Once the main generating units are running, the electrical transmission network can be re-connected and electrical loads restored.

Black-start power may be ensured by an agreement where a particular energy supplier is paid to make black start power available when required. Not all generating plants are suitable for providing black-start power to a network. The ability to perform a black start requires complex technology and is economically costly. In addition, the power plant providing the black start must be located close to the electricity users.

== Station service power ==
Electrical generating plants require electric power to operate systems required in the plant. For example, a coal-fuelled plant requires conveyors, crushers, air compressors, and combustion air fans to operate. Steam cycle plants require large pumps to circulate water for steam boilers and for cooling of condensate water. Hydroelectric plants require power to open intake gates, and to adjust the hydraulic turbines for speed regulation. Even a wind turbine plant may require a relatively small amount of electric power for such things as adjusting blade pitch and direction.

Normally, the electric power used within the plant is provided by the station's own generators. If all of the plant's main generators are shut down, station service power is provided by drawing power from the grid through the plant's transmission line. However, during a wide-area outage, off-site power from the grid is not available. In the absence of grid power, a so-called black start needs to be performed to bootstrap the power grid into operation.

=== Standby power sources ===
To provide a black start, some power stations or plant have small on-site diesel generators, normally called the black start diesel generator (BSDG), which can be used to start larger generators (of several megawatts capacity), which in turn can be used to start the main power station generators. Generating plants using steam turbines require station service power of up to 10% of their capacity for boiler feedwater pumps, boiler forced-draft combustion air blowers, and for fuel preparation. It is uneconomical to provide such a large standby capacity at each station, so black-start power must be provided over designated tie lines from another station.

Often hydroelectric power plants are designated as the black-start sources to restore network interconnections. A hydroelectric station needs very little initial power for starting purposes (just enough to open the intake gates and provide excitation current to the generator field coils) and can put a large block of power on line very quickly to allow start-up of fossil fuel or nuclear stations. Certain types of combustion turbine can be configured for a black start, providing another option in places without suitable hydroelectric plants. In 2017, a utility in Southern California successfully demonstrated the use of an energy-storage system based on a lithium-ion battery to provide a black start, firing up a combined-cycle gas turbine from an idle state.

=== Startup sequence ===
One method of black start (based on a real scenario) might be as follows:

1. A battery starts a small diesel generator installed in a hydroelectric generating station.
2. The power from the diesel generator is used to bring the generating station into operation.
3. Key transmission lines between the station and other areas are energized.
4. The power from the station is used to start one of the nuclear/fossil-fuel-fired base load plants.
5. The power from the base load plant is used to restart all of the other power plants in the system.
6. Power is finally re-applied to the general electricity distribution network and sent to the consumers.

Often this will happen gradually; starting the entire grid at once may be unfeasible. In particular, after a lengthy outage during summer, all buildings will be warm, and if the power were restored at once, the demand in a cooling climate from air conditioning units alone would be more than the grid could supply. In colder climates, a similar issue can occur in winter with the use of heating devices including heat pumps.

In a larger grid, in addition to this "single island" ("bottom-up") approach, different strategies can be involved:

- multiple islands of generation (each with local power supplying local load areas) synchronizing and reconnecting to form a complete grid. The power stations involved have to be able to accept large step changes in load as the grid is reconnected;
- anchor ("core") island (also bottom-up);
- "backbone island" (bottom-up): backbone is restored first, thus allowing the outside assistance;
- top-down: backbone restored first with outside assistance;
- a combination of top-down and bottom-up approaches.

There are multiple methods of commencing a black start of an island: hydroelectric dams, diesel generators, open cycle gas turbines, grid scale battery stores, compressed air storage, and so on. Different generating networks take different approaches, dependent on factors such as cost, complexity, the availability of local resources (e.g. suitable valleys for dams), the interconnectivity with other generating networks, and the response time necessary for the black start process.

== Procurement of black start services ==
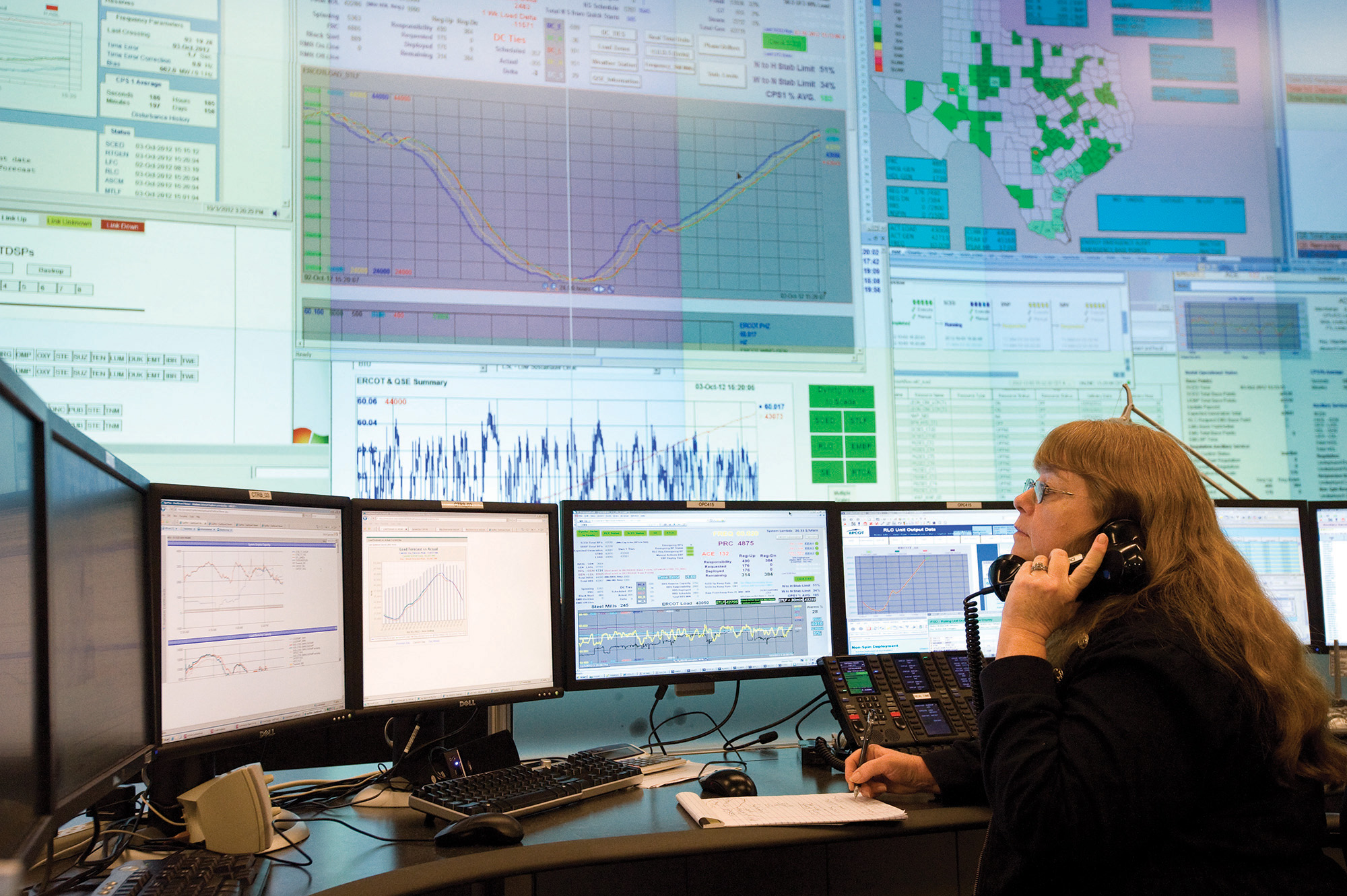
An operator at ERCOT

In Great Britain, the grid operator has commercial agreements in place with some generators to provide black start capacity, recognizing that black start facilities are often not economical in normal grid operation. It is typical of power stations from the era of the Central Electricity Generating Board to have a number of open-cycle gas turbines (i.e. no heat recovery modules attached) that can run the entirety of the plant necessary to operate a full generating unit; these would normally be started by diesel generators, fed in turn by battery backups. Once up to speed, these gas turbines are capable of running the entire plant associated with the rest of the power station, negating the need to bring power in from other sources.

In the North American independent system operators, the procurement of black starting varies somewhat. Traditionally, the black-start capability was provided by integrated utilities and the costs were rolled into a broad tariff for cost recovery from ratepayers. In those areas which are not part of organized electricity markets, this is still the usual procurement mechanism. In the deregulated environment, this legacy of cost-based provision has persisted, and even recent overhauls of black-start procurement practices, such as that by the ISO New England, have not necessarily shifted to a competitive procurement, even though deregulated jurisdictions have a bias for market solutions rather than cost-of-service (COS) solutions.

In the United States, there are currently three methods of procuring black start. The most common is cost-of-service, as it is the simplest and is the traditional method. It is currently used by the California Independent System Operator (CAISO), the PJM Interconnection and the New York Independent System Operator (NYISO). The exact mechanisms differ somewhat the same approach is used, namely that units are identified for black start and their documented costs are then funded and rolled into a tariff for cost recovery.

The second method is a new method used by the Independent System Operator of New England (ISO-NE). The new methodology is a flat-rate payment which increases black-start remuneration to encourage provision. The monthly compensation paid to a generator is determined by multiplying a flat rate (in dollars per kWyr and referred to as the $Y value) by the unit's Monthly Claimed Capability for that month. The purpose of this change was to simplify procurement and encourage provision of the black start service.

The final method of procurement is competitive procurement as used by the Electric Reliability Council of Texas (ERCOT). Under this approach, ERCOT runs a market for black-start services. Interested participants submit an hourly standby cost in dollars per hour (e.g. $70 per hour), often termed an availability bid, that is unrelated to the capacity of the unit. Using various criteria, ERCOT evaluates these bids and the selected units are paid as bid, presuming an 85% availability. Each black-start unit must be able to demonstrate that it can start another unit in close proximity, in order to begin the islanding and synchronization of the grid.

In other jurisdictions there are differing methods of procurement. The New Zealand System Operator procures the blackstart capability via competitive tender. Other jurisdictions also appear to have some sort of competitive procurement, albeit perhaps not as structured as that of ERCOT. These include the Alberta Electric System Operator, as well as Independent Electric System Operator of Ontario, both of which use a long-term "request for proposals" approach similar to New Zealand and ERCOT.

The first black start on Germany's grid was tested in 2017 at WEMAG battery power station in Schwerin on a disconnected, isolated grid. The WEMAG battery plant proved that it can restore the power grid after major disruption or blackout.

== Limitations on black start sources ==
Not all generating plants are suitable for black-start capability. With respect to the black-start capabilities, the generators are classified into two groups:

- BS generators (also black-start units, BSU) capable of starting quickly using on-site resources. Typical examples are provided by;
  - Hydropower that requires relatively small amounts of power to control the intake gates for its operation;
  - Diesel generator units that can use a pre-charged battery for starting;
  - Gas turbine generators that can be started electrically using battery power;
- NBS generators ("non-black-start units", NBSU) that require external energy (cranking power) to start. A typical example is a steam turbine unit. Micro-hydro generator units usually rely on the grid for the frequency control and reactive power management and cannot be used as BS generators as well.

An additional requirement for the BS generator is its ability to support a large reactive load of a long transmission line, so the faraway NBS units can be energized. A typical BS generator is a small (10–50 MW) hydro or gas turbine generation unit.

The output of variable renewable energy (VRE) sources is not predictable, this makes them difficult to use for black start or support in the grid restoration, as the lack of control, inherent in VRE sources, might cause a weak grid emerging from a blackout to collapse yet again.

Wind turbines in particular are not always suitable for black start because wind may not be available when needed. Wind turbines, mini-hydro, or micro-hydro plants, are often connected to induction generators which are incapable of providing power to re-energize the network. In 2020, the 69 MW Dersalloch wind farm black-started part of the Scotland grid, using virtual synchronous machines. The black-start unit must also be stable when operated with the large reactive load of a long transmission line. "Classic" high-voltage direct current (HVDC) converters (LCC-HVDC) cannot operate into a "dead" system, either, since they require commutation power from the system at the load end. A pulse-width modulation (PWM)-based voltage-source converter HVDC (VSC-HVDC) scheme has no such restriction.

== See also ==
- Bootstrapping
- Diesel generator
- 2025 Iberian Peninsula blackout
- Power outage
- Synchroscope

== Sources ==
- Gevorgian, V.; Shah, S.; Koralewicz, P.; Wallen, R.; Mendiola, E. (March 30, 2021). "Black start from DER" (PDF). nrel.gov. NREL ESIG 2021 Spring Technical Workshop.
- PJM (2018). "Transmission ITP: System Restoration". pjm.com. PJM State & Member Training Dept.
- O’Brien, James G.; Cassiadoro, Michael; Becejac, Tamara; Sheble, Gerald B.; Follum, James; Agrawal, Urmila; Andersen, Eric; Touhiduzzaman, Md; Dagle, Jeffery (April 2022). Electric Grid Blackstart: Trends, Challenges, and Opportunities. Richland, Washington: Pacific Northwest National Laboratory.
- Sun, Kai; Hou, Yunhe; Sun, Wei; Qi, Junjian (2019). Power System Control Under Cascading Failures: Understanding, Mitigation, and System Restoration. Wiley-IEEE Press. ISBN 978-1-119-28202-0.
