= IEEE 1547 =

IEEE standard on interconnection of distributed generation resources into the power grid

IEEE 1547 (Standard for Interconnecting Distributed Resources with Electric Power Systems) is a standard of the Institute of Electrical and Electronics Engineers meant to provide a set of criteria and requirements for the interconnection of distributed generation resources into the power grid.

== Purpose ==
"This document provides a uniform standard for interconnection of distributed resources with EPSs [Electric Power Systems]. It provides requirements relevant to the performance, operation, testing, safety, and maintenance of the interconnection."

With the increased adoption of distributed resources in the present and future, a set of standards regarding their usage in the grid becomes increasingly important for the overall reliability, safety, and cost. Furthermore, the lack of a concrete national standard was seen as a roadblock to the implementation of new distributed generation projects. The standard is intended to be universally adoptable, technology-neutral, and cover distributed resources as large 10 MVA.

== Development ==
In early 1999, the IEEE approved the undertaking of P1547. With the support of the United States Department of Energy, the project was initiated on a fast-track basis, which would halve the usual development time. The draft standard was revised 10 times before P1547/Draft 11 was approved with a 91% vote in February 2003. It was then approved by the IEEE Standards Board on June 12, 2003, and received an ANSI designation on October 20, 2003.

== Risk of system disturbance ==
IEEE 1547-2003 had a tight underfrequency protection setting of 59.3 Hz which posed a risk for grid stability. In case of an underfrequency situation, e.g. after a major loss of generation, the situation may get worse when a multitude of distributed energy resources (DER) disconnect simultaneously. IEEE 1547-2003 demanded also an obligatory overfrequency disconnection at 60.5 Hz. With a rising share of distributed generation there is a possibility of triggering a non-linear oscillator in the multi GW range within the transmission grid. In Europe, this problem with similar standards has already been addressed by ENTSO-E. IEEE 1547-2018 now allows operation from 56.5Hz to 62Hz with frequency droop included.

A separate risk is that the protocol communication has no authentication, so malicious disturbance may go undetected.

== Energy Policy Act of 2005 ==
"Interconnection services shall be offered based upon the standards developed by the Institute of Electrical and Electronics Engineers: IEEE Standard 1547 for Interconnecting Distributed Resources With Electric Power Systems, as they may be amended from time to time."

The Energy Policy Act of 2005 established IEEE 1547 as the national standard for the interconnection of distributed generation resources in the United States of America.

== Related standards ==
Currently, there are six complementary standards designed to expand upon or clarify the initial standard, two of which are published, and the other four still in the draft phase.

- IEEE 1547.1, published in 2005 and updated in May 2020, further describes the testing of the interconnection in order to determine whether or not it conforms to standards.
- IEEE 1547.2, published in 2008, provides a technical background on the standard.
- IEEE P1547.3, draft in progress, details cyber security guidelines.
- IEEE 1547.4, published in 2011, is a guide for the design, operation, and integration of conforming systems.
- IEEE 1547.6, published in 2011, describes practices for secondary network interconnections.
- IEEE 1547.7, published in 2013, provides distribution impact studies for distributed resource interconnection.
- IEEE P1547.9, draft in progress, details energy storage guidelines
- IEEE 1547-2018, published in 2018, IEEE Standard for Interconnection and Interoperability of Distributed Energy Resources with Associated Electric Power Systems Interfaces. Revision to IEEE 1547-2003

== See also ==
- Net metering
